The observance of Christmas around the world varies by country. The day of Christmas, and in some cases the day before and the day after, are recognized by many national governments and cultures worldwide, including in areas where Christianity is a minority religion. In some non-Christian areas, periods of former colonial rule introduced the celebration (e.g. Hong Kong); in others, Christian minorities or foreign cultural influences have led populations to observe the holiday.

Christmas traditions for many nations include the installing and lighting of Christmas trees, the hanging of Advent wreaths, Christmas stockings, candy canes, setting out cookies and milk, and the creation of Nativity scenes depicting the birth of Jesus Christ. Christmas carols may be sung and stories told about such figures as the Baby Jesus, St Nicholas, Santa Claus, Father Christmas, Christkind or Grandfather Frost. The sending and exchange of Christmas card greetings, observance of fasting and special religious observances such as a midnight Mass or Vespers on Christmas Eve, the burning of a Yule log, and the giving and receiving of presents are also common practice. Along with Easter, Christmas is one of the most important periods on the Christian calendar, and is often closely connected to other holidays at this time of year, such as Advent, the Feast of the Immaculate Conception, St Nicholas Day, St. Stephen's Day, New Year's, and the Feast of the Epiphany.

Many national governments recognize Christmas as an official public holiday, while others recognize it in a symbolic way but not as an official legal observance. Countries in which Christmas is not a formal public holiday include Afghanistan, Algeria, Azerbaijan, Bahrain, Bhutan, Brunei Darussalam, Cambodia, China (excepting Hong Kong and Macau), the Comoros, Iran, Israel, Japan, Kuwait, Laos, Libya, the Maldives, Mauritania,  Morocco, North Korea, Oman, Qatar, the Sahrawi Republic, Saudi Arabia, Somalia, Taiwan (Republic of China), Tajikistan, Thailand, Tunisia, Turkey, Turkmenistan, the United Arab Emirates, Uzbekistan, Vietnam, and Yemen.  Countries such as Japan, where Christmas is not a public holiday but is popular despite there being only a small number of Christians, have adopted many of the secular aspects of Christmas, such as gift-giving, decorations, and Christmas trees.

Christmas celebrations around the world can vary markedly in form, reflecting differing cultural and national traditions. Among countries with a strong Christian tradition, a variety of Christmas celebrations have developed that incorporate regional and local cultures.

Geographical variation

Africa

Ethiopia and Eritrea 

Christmas Day is a public holiday in Eritrea that is celebrated on January 7 or on 27 Tahsas of the Ethiopian calendar. Many Christians in the two countries fast for 40 days, in a fast called the Fast of the Prophets). They then head to church at dawn on Christmas morning. On Christmas Day, there are colorful musical celebrations which involve the priests dressed in their best robes performing rituals, including dancing and playing drums and other instruments. Early in the morning at dawn, everyone dresses in white and heads to the nearby church. Late in the afternoon is the traditional game of gena, a kind of hockey. According to an Ethiopian legend, the game was played by the shepherds who were tending their flocks on the night that Jesus was born. The game is attended by the leader of the community and the winner is awarded a prize. Most Ethiopians don a traditional shamma, a thin, white cotton wrap with brightly colored stripes across the ends. The holiday is followed up by the three-day festival Timkat, starting on January 19 and celebrating the baptism of Jesus Christ.

Nigeria 
Christmas Day is a public holiday in Nigeria which is always marked by the emptying of towns and cities of Nigerians who have been successful returning to their ancestral villages to be with family and to bless those less fortunate. As the towns and cities empty, people jam the West African markets to buy and transport live chickens, goats and cows that will be needed for the Christmas meals.

On Christmas Eve, traditional meals are prepared according to the traditions of each region. Nigerians as a whole tend to prepare various meats in large quantities. In the south, a dish called jollof rice is served with stews of various meats along with boiled beans and fried plantains; in the north, rice and stew as well as tuwon shinkafa, a rice pudding served with various meat stews, is preferred. In the north several local desserts are also made which are rarely found in other parts of Nigeria. An alternative in both regions (but more favored in the south) is a pepper soup with fish, goat, or beef which may also be served with fufu (pounded yam). Served with this food are an array of mainly alcoholic drinks such as the traditional palm wine or various local and imported beers and wines; children and women may be served locally-made soft-drink equivalents instead.

Gift giving in Nigeria often involves money and the flow of gifts from the more fortunate to the less fortunate. After the "successful" visitors have come from their towns, cities, and even overseas, they are given time to settle in. Afterwards, local relatives begin approaching them asking for assistance of some kind, whether financial or not. Financial donations and elaborately wrapped gifts may be given out at lavish parties, weddings, and ceremonies; sometimes the money is scattered in the air to be grabbed by the others or stuck onto the sweaty foreheads of those dancing.

Religion in Nigeria is about equally divided between Christians and Muslims.

Senegal

Christmas is a popular holiday in the Muslim-majority country of Senegal.

South Africa 

Christmas in South Africa is a public holiday celebrated on December 25. Many European traditions are maintained despite the distance from Europe.

Christmas trees are set up in homes and children are given presents in their stockings. Traditional 'fir' Christmas trees are popular. On Christmas Eve children leave a stocking or milk and cookies out for Santa Claus, who brings them gifts. Towns and cities have Carols by Candlelight in the beginning of the festive season where groups of people come together to sing Christmas carols and donate toys and clothing to needy children.

The Christmas meal can include mince pies, turkey, gammon, beef tongue, turducken, corned beef, green salad, roast beef or a barbecue outdoors. The meal is finished with christmas pudding, ice cream or trifle. Christmas crackers are used to make noise.

Despite Christmas occurring at the height of the Southern Hemisphere summer, wintry motifs common to the Northern Hemisphere are popular.

Zambia
Christmas is an official holiday in the Christian-official nation of Zambia. The holiday involves churches filled with scenes of nativity plays and carols for charity.

Americas

Caribbean

Bahamas 
Junkanoo festivals are held Boxing Day, December 26 and again on New Year's Day. It is a local cultural event dating back to its African heritage featuring goat skin drums, cowbell and brass instruments, singing, and choreographed dancers dressed in traditional handmade colorful costumes.

Bahamian Christmas foods include benny cake, coconut cake, flour cake from Acklins and Cat Island, fruit cake, baked ham and turkey, traditional peas and rice, baked macaroni, coleslaw, plantains, fried fish, boiled fish (Nassau Grouper and snappers) and Johnny cake. Drinks like eggnog, lemonade and local beers (Kalik and Sands) are also served on Christmas.

Cuba 
Cuba has a long tradition of celebrating Christmas. Families used to gather at the dining table, and used to go to mass after dinner.
The Communist Regime led by Fidel Castro abolished the paid Christmas holiday in 1969, citing that workers were needed to continue the sugar harvest. In 1998, the Regime declared December 25 a leisure day, as requested by Pope John Paul II as a condition to visit the country. It is a one-day public holiday and it is celebrated only in the evening.

Jamaica 

Radio stations play Christmas carols as early as October, both reggae-style and some international. Jamaicans paint their houses and hang new curtains for Christmas. Pepper lights, the local name for Christmas lights, go up even on trees.

Junkanoo or John Canoe is a traditional Christmas celebration in Jamaica, influenced by African heritage. This includes street dancing and a great parade through the streets with Jamaicans dressed in colorful masquerade costumes and masks. The traditional Jamaican Christmas meal includes ackee, saltfish, breadfruit, fried plantains, boiled bananas, freshly squeezed fruit juice and tea for breakfast; chicken, curried goat, stewed oxtail, rice and gungo peas for dinner. For dessert, sorrel drink and a Jamaican rum fruitcake along with red wine are served in many homes.

Many people attend church for Christmas Eve or Christmas morning worship service. Some people go to the Christmas Eve Grand Market to walk with family and friends and shop until 2 or 3 a.m. Christmas Day. Some British Christmas traditions have stayed in Jamaica, like Father Christmas, roast beef or lamb dinners, and Boxing Day.

Central America

El Salvador 
Christmas in El Salvador carries a strong meaning that brings families together. Despite the business on the streets and the red, green and white colors flooding the environment, Salvadoran people try to honor what they consider to be the true meaning of Christmas, the birth of Jesus.
In El Salvador children celebrate Christmas by playing with firecrackers, fountains, such as the small  ('little volcanos') and sparklers,  ('little stars'). Teenagers and young adults display bigger fireworks or Roman Candles. Families also have parties in which they dance and eat. 
Santa Claus is known for appearing in TV and print ads, but people ask children if they already wrote a letter to little baby Jesus. Traditional Salvadoran Christmas dishes are sautéed turkey sandwiches in a baguette with lettuce and radishes, Salvadoran tamales, and sweet bread for dessert. Drinks include hot chocolate, pineapple juice, Salvadoran horchata, Salvadoran cherry horchata, and coffee. At 12:00 a.m. on December 25, everyone gathers around the Christmas tree and opens their presents.

Guatemala 
As with much of the country's culture, the celebration includes Spanish and Mayan elements.

North America 

Christmas is observed widely on December 25. Governments recognizing the holiday include those of the United States, where it is a federal holiday for federal employees and a legal holiday in the respective states; Canada, where it is a nationwide statutory holiday; Mexico, where it is also a nationwide statutory holiday; and several others.

Canada 

In the Canadian provinces where English is the predominant language, Christmas traditions are largely similar to those of the United States, with some lingering influences from the United Kingdom and newer traditions brought by immigrants from other European countries. Mince pies, plum pudding, and Christmas cake are traditionally served as Christmas dinner desserts, following the traditional meal of roast turkey, stuffing, potatoes, and winter vegetables. Christmas table crackers are not uncommon and, in some parts of Newfoundland, Prince Edward Island and Nova Scotia, Christmas traditions include mummers.

North American influences on Christmas are evident in the hanging of stockings on Christmas Eve, to be filled by Santa Claus. However, Canadian children believe that the home of Santa Claus is located at the North Pole, in Canada, and, through Canada Post, address thousands of letters to Santa Claus each year, using the postal code designation H0H 0H0. The tradition of decorating Christmas trees, whether fresh-cut or artificial, was introduced to Canada in 1781, originally by German soldiers stationed in Quebec during the American Revolution, and are now common in private homes and commercial spaces throughout most of Canada.

As Canada is a cold, dark country in winter, lights are often put up in public places and on commercial and residential buildings in November and December. Many communities have celebrations that include light events, such as the Cavalcade of Lights Festival in Toronto, the Montreal Christmas Fireworks, or the Bright Nights in Stanley Park, Vancouver. A national program, Christmas Lights Across Canada, illuminates Ottawa, the national capital, and the 13 provincial and territorial capitals.

In the province of Quebec, Christmas traditions include réveillon, Père Noël ('Father Christmas'), and the bûche de Noël (Yule log), among many others.

The Royal Christmas Message from the Canadian monarch is televised nationwide in Canada, the occasion being an observance which unites Canadians with citizens of the other Commonwealth countries worldwide. The observation of Boxing Day on the day following Christmas Day is a tradition practiced in Canada, as it is in many other Anglophone countries, although not in the United States. In Canada, Boxing Day is a day (or the beginning of a few days) of deeply discounted sale prices at retail stores which attract large numbers of shoppers in search of bargains.

Christmas is known as Quviasukvik in the territories of Nunavut, the Northwest Territories and Yukon and the areas of Nunavik, Nunatsiavut and NunatuKavut and the Inuit celebrate it as their New Year.

Greenland 

Christmas in Greenland is usually celebrated on the evening of December 24th and the days of the 25th and 26th. The Christmas season begins on the first day of Advent, which is the fourth Sunday before Christmas day, when Christmas trees are put up and decorated, and villages also put a large Christmas tree on a nearby hill. Christmas is known as Quviasukvik and the Inuit celebrate it as their New Year.

Mexico 

Christmas is a statutory holiday in Mexico and workers can have the day off with pay. Mexico's Christmas is filled with over 30 traditions found only within Mexican Christmas. Over nine days, groups of townspeople go from door to door in a fashion of when the parents of the unborn baby Jesus Christ looked for shelter to pass the night when they arrived at Bethlehem, and are periodically called inside homes to participate in the breaking of a candy-filled piñata.

Mexican Christmas festivities start on December 12, with the feast of La Guadalupana (Virgin of Guadalupe), and end on January 6, with the Epiphany. Since the 1990s, Mexican society has embraced a new concept linking several celebrations around the Christmas season into what is known as the Guadalupe-Reyes Marathon. At midnight on Christmas, many families place the figure of baby Jesus in their  (Nativity scenes), as the symbolic representation of Christmas as a whole. In the center and south of Mexico, children receive gifts on Christmas Eve and on January 6, they celebrate the Feast of the Epiphany, when, according to tradition, the Three Wise Men brought gifts to Bethlehem for Jesus Christ. Santa Claus (or Santa Clos, as he is known in Mexico) is who brings the children their gifts, but traditionally the Three Wise Men will fill the children's shoes with candies, oranges, tangerines, nuts, and sugar cane, and sometimes money or gold, symbolizing the very gifts they gave to the Baby Jesus in Bethlehem during his infancy and a reflection of his future destiny as saviour of the world.

United States 

Christmas is a widely celebrated festive holiday in the United States, and Christmas Day is officially recognized as a federal holiday by the US Government. The Christmas and holiday season begins around the end of November with a major shopping kickoff on Black Friday, the day after the U.S. holiday of Thanksgiving, though the period during which Christmas decorations are present and thematically appropriate music is playing in stores sometimes extends into the period between Halloween and Thanksgiving. Many schools and businesses are closed during the period between Christmas and the New Year's Day holiday, which is a time commonly used to spend time with family and close friends.  Most decorations are taken down by New Years or Epiphany. Other observances considered part of the season (and potentially included in non-denominational holiday greetings like "Happy Holidays") include Hanukkah, Yule, Epiphany,  celebrations. December 26, popularly referred to as Boxing Day or St. Stephen's Day elsewhere in the Western world, is only known widely as the "Day after Christmas" in the U.S., and is observed in a number of states under that name, but is not a federal holiday. Christmas is known as Quviasukvik in the state of Alaska and the Inuit, the Yupik, the Aleut and the Iñupiat celebrate it as their New Year.

The interiors and exteriors of houses are decorated during the weeks leading up to Christmas Eve. Christmas tree farms in the United States and Canada provide families with trees for their homes, many opting for artificial ones, but some for real ones. The Christmas tree usually stands centrally in the home, decorated with ornaments, tinsel, and lights, with an angel or a star symbolizing the Star of Bethlehem at the top.

Christmas Eve is popularly described as "the night before Christmas" in the poem actually titled "A Visit from St. Nicholas". Better known as Santa Claus, he is said to visit homes while children are sleeping during the night before Christmas morning. The fireplaces in many homes have been replaced by electric fireplaces, but the yule log has remained a tradition. Christmas stockings are hung on the mantelpiece for Santa Claus to fill with little gifts ("stocking stuffers"). It is tradition throughout the United States for children to leave a glass of milk and plate of Christmas cookies for Santa Claus nearby.

Presents the family will exchange are wrapped and placed near the tree, including presents to be given to pets. Friends exchange wrapped presents and tell each other not to open presents before Christmas. Grandparents, aunts and uncles, cousins, siblings and occasionally guests from out of town are entertained in the home or else visited. Wrapped presents are most commonly opened on the morning of Christmas Day; however, some families choose to open all or some of their presents on Christmas Eve, depending on evolving family traditions, logistics, and the age of the children involved; for example, adults might open their presents on Christmas Eve and minor children on Christmas morning, or everyone might open their gifts on Christmas morning. Others follow the tradition of opening family-exchanged gifts on Christmas Eve night, followed by opening of the presents Santa brought on Christmas morning. Children are normally allowed to play with their new toys and games afterwards.

The traditional Christmas dinner usually features either roasted turkey with stuffing (sometimes called dressing), ham, or roast beef. Potatoes, squash, roasted vegetables and cranberry sauce are served along with tonics and sherries. A variety of sweet pastry and egg nog sprinkled with cinnamon and nutmeg are served in the United States. Certain dishes such as casseroles and desserts are often prepared with a family recipe. Sometimes, families also partake in a religious tradition, such as the consumption of a Christmas wafer in Christian families of European ancestry. Fruits, nuts, cheeses and chocolates are enjoyed as snacks.

Other traditions include a special church service on the Sunday before Christmas and Midnight Mass on Christmas Eve. Candlelight services are held earlier in the evening for families with children, and special Christmas services may be held earlier in the season for people who may be traveling out of town closer to the holiday. A re-enactment of the Nativity of Jesus called a Nativity play is another tradition.

Christmas-related tourist attractions, such as the Rockefeller Center Christmas tree and elaborate animated department store Christmas windows in New York City are heavily visited by tourists from all over the world. Christmas music can be heard in the background. The Mormon Tabernacle Choir is one whose annual carol singing is well-recognized. Christmas symphony orchestra and choral presentation such as Handel's Messiah and performances of The Nutcracker ballet are attended. Local radio stations may temporarily switch format to play exclusively Christmas music, some going to an all-Christmas format as early as mid-October. A few television stations broadcast a Yule Log without interruption for several hours. News broadcasts and talk shows feature Christmas-themed segments, emphasizing fellowship and goodwill among neighbors. Of particular note is the observance of Christmas for military families of soldiers and sailors serving abroad, on both sides of the Canada–U.S. border. The Los Angeles Lakers have made it a tradition, since they relocated from Minneapolis prior to the 1960-61 NBA season, to have a home game on Christmas. As of 2015, the NBA now schedules five games on Christmas, usually including classic rivalry games as well as a rematch of the previous season's NBA Finals.

South America

Brazil 

Christmas Day on December 25 is a national holiday in Brazil. Because Brazil lies in the Southern Hemisphere, Brazilians celebrate Christmas in the summer. In the small cities in the entire country, as well as in the largest cities, like São Paulo, Rio de Janeiro, Recife, Salvador, Fortaleza, Curitiba, Porto Alegre, Goiânia, Brasília, Manaus, Belém, Natal and Belo Horizonte, the celebrations resemble in many ways the traditions in Europe and North America, with the Christmas tree, the exchanging of gifts and Christmas cards, the decoration of houses and buildings with electric lights and the nativity scene. Despite the warm tropical summer weather, some incongruences such as decorations with themes of winter and snow are not uncommon. In some cities like Guarapuava, there are decoration contests, when judges go to houses to look at the decorations, inside or outside of the house, and decide the most beautiful house. Christmas Eve is the most important day.

Many Brazilians decorate their homes with a Christmas Tree. There is no rule, and the parents can decorate it by themselves as a surprise to the kids, or they can do it together. Nativity scenes are very popular in Brazil, and can be seen everywhere including churches and popular places around the town. Like many other countries, Christmas dinner in Brazil is normally served late in the evening on Christmas Eve around 10 or 11 p.m. The meal often includes farofa stuffing, assortments of fruit, fried cod, and roast turkey with a dessert called rabanada. Along with their meals, Brazilians typically drink champagne, wine, and fruit punch. Typically after they eat, many Brazilians attend a Midnight Mass service or watch the Pope's television broadcast celebration of "Midnight Mass in Rome" with family and friends.

Colombia 

Christmas is a public holiday in Colombia and is primarily a religious celebration.

While Christmas decorations may be put up as early as the beginning of November, the unofficial start of Colombian Christmas festivities takes place on December 7, Día de las Velitas, or 'Day of the Candles.' At night, the streets, sidewalks, balconies, porches, and driveways are decorated with candles and paper lanterns, which illuminate cities and towns in a yellow glow to honor the Immaculate Conception on the following day, December 8. In many cities, and even in small rural towns, neighborhoods get together and decorate their whole neighborhood or street, turning streets into virtual "tunnels of light." Many radio stations and local organizations hold contests for the best display of lights, making the competition for the best light show a serious event. The city of Medellín has become a popular tourist destination during the holiday season because of its Christmas lights. Activities such as musical events and firework displays are planned by cities and held during this time. Individually launched fireworks were a common item during the Christmas season in Colombia, often going on at any time of the day in many cities. However, a recent ban has decreased the individual use of fireworks, and now only cities or towns are able to hold firework displays.

December 16 is the first day of the Christmas Novena, a devotion consisting of prayer said on nine successive days, the last one held on Christmas Eve. The Novena is promoted by the Catholic Church as a staple of Christmas, and is very similar to the posadas celebrated in Mexico. It is a call for an understanding of the religious meaning of Christmas, and a way to counter the commercialism of the Christmas season. Novenas serve as religious gatherings as well as learning environments for young children since kids have a central and active role in the celebration of the Novenas (they read prayers, sing, and play instruments guided by their family). From December 16 to 24, games called  are played after having made a "pinky promise" deciding the prize for the winner and the punishment for the loser. Churches offer dawn and nightly masses during the nine days of the novena, culminating with the Misa de Gallo ('Rooster's Mass') on Christmas Eve at midnight.

Christmas Eve is the most important day of Christmas in Colombia. Families and friends get together to pray the last novena and wait until midnight to open the presents, parties are held until sunrise on Christmas Day, kids stay up late playing with their new presents, and fireworks fill the skies. Families gather around meals, music, and singing. Because Christmas Eve is the most important day, little occurs on December 25. Families join Christmas Day mass although it is not nearly as festive as Christmas Eve.

The , or the Day of the Innocents, falls in the Christmas season, on December 28. The day commemorates the innocent infants (called the innocent ones) who were said to have been killed by King Herod in fear of the power of the newborn baby, Jesus. January 6, the day of the Revelation of the Magi (Epiphany), is called  (from The Three Magi), used to be a day of gift-giving, but is celebrated less now since gifts are given mostly around Christmas Eve today. Some families still give presents, and it is also the day when godparents give Christmas presents.

Guyana 
Christmas Day is a public holiday in Guyana celebrated by native and overseas Guyanese. People participate in a street parade of colourful masquerades filled with colourful outfits and performances. A popular traditional Christmas food is pepperpot, a national dish and type of meat stew eaten during breakfast.

Uruguay 

Christmas Day, December 25, is a public holiday in Uruguay, although it is officially called "Family Day" since the separation of church and state at the beginning of the 20th century. In many cities, Christmas markets are set up where toys, clothes, decorations and food are sold.

The celebrations begin at nightfall on Christmas Eve (December 24), with family gatherings where traditionally they eat asado, vitél toné, and desserts such as turrón and panetone, which were incorporated into Uruguayan culture due to European Immigration to the country. At the stroke of midnight, people flock to the streets to enjoy fireworks and light firecrackers; meanwhile,  (Santa Claus) leaves, next to the Christmas trees, gifts that the children asked for in letters that they left throughout the month in shopping centers and other places where he is seen. There is also an exchange of gifts between family and friends.

Because Uruguay lies in the Southern Hemisphere, Christmas is celebrated in summer, which is why open-air music festivals are held from noon on the 24th, and early morning until the 25th, mainly in coastal cities such as Montevideo and Punta del Este, which receives a large number of tourists from neighboring countries. On Christmas Day the whole population has the day off to be with their family and friends, so public transport, malls and offices are closed down.

Venezuela 

In Venezuela, Christmas is celebrated as a religious occasion.

The unofficial start of the Christmas festivities is after the celebrations of Feria de la Chinita, the second half of November. The origin of this festival is the honor to Virgin Mary of Chiquinquirá, with various religious activities, processions, and music in the typical Gaita style to honor La Chinita (nickname of this Virgin). This event takes place in the Zulia Region, specifically in Maracaibo (the regional capital) and holiday decorations begin to be seen in public places in the state. After this, the season begins in other parts of Venezuela and many activities take place including musical events and firework displays, especially in major cities and state capitals.

These events are usually sponsored by the local parish church, where neighbors organize themselves and sell typical Christmas food, hot chocolate, hallaca, cookies, etc. Also, still in some neighborhoods is the parranda, where people go caroling from house to house, singing and receiving food and drinks, this tradition is rooted among Afro-Venezuelans with origins in Africa. The same tradition, though called Paradura del Niño exists in the Venezuelan Andes; however, the carolers carry an image of Baby Jesus. Children write request letters to Baby Jesus. The presents are sent by Baby Jesus at midnight, and most people have a party, which goes on until sunrise.

Asia

Central Asia

Uzbekistan 
Christmas is not an official holiday in Uzbekistan. Out of a population of 35 million, approximately 2.2 percent is Russian Orthodox. Since the fall of the Soviet Union, this number has continued to decline as ethnic Russians and other Orthodox Christians emigrate to other countries. The Christians of Uzbekistan celebrate Christmas on 25 December in the Julian calendar used by the church, which falls on 7 January in the common Gregorian calendar. 

Much like in the rest of the Soviet Union, Christmas was largely erased from the calendar during much of the 20th century under the Soviets' anti-religious policies, but many traditions survived having been transplanted to New Year's. Christmas is still eclipsed by New Year's Day in Uzbekistan, which remains a major holiday even among Christians.

Christmas symbols and decorations similar to those found in Europe or the US can be seen on the streets of larger cities, but for a majority of the population Christmas is simply a part of New Year celebrations. Many people, including Muslims, decorate a Christmas tree, even though they do not celebrate Christmas and call the tree New Year's tree.

East Asia

China 
In China, December 25 is not a legal holiday. However, it is still designated as a public holiday in China's special administrative regions of Hong Kong and Macau, former colonies of the United Kingdom and Portugal respectively.

In the mainland, the small percentage of Chinese citizens who consider themselves Christians unofficially, and usually privately, observe Christmas. Many other individuals celebrate Christmas-like festivities even though they do not consider themselves Christians. Many customs, including sending cards, exchanging gifts, and hanging stockings are very similar to Western celebrations. Commercial Christmas decorations, signs, and other symbolic items have become increasingly prevalent during the month of December in large urban centres of mainland China, reflecting a cultural interest in this Western phenomenon, and, sometimes, retail marketing campaigns as well.

Hong Kong 

In Hong Kong, where Christmas is a public holiday, many buildings facing Victoria Harbour will be decorated with Christmas lights. Christmas trees are found in major malls and other public buildings, and in some homes as well, despite the small living area. Catholics in Hong Kong can attend Christmas Mass.

Hong Kong was deeply influenced by British and Western culture during the colonial era. Christmas is one of the most valued festivals in Hong Kong after Lunar New Year. The Christmas atmosphere is also stronger than most countries in Asia. Both Christmas Day on December 25 and Boxing Day on 26th are public holidays. On Boxing Day on the 26th, there is no holiday and no supplementary holiday. The custom of celebrating Christmas in the early years was not extensive. It was not common until the 1970s, when the society of Hong Kong stabilized, that the number of people celebrating Christmas began to increase. Although Christians account for only one-eighth of the population of Hong Kong, the Christmas Day atmosphere is still strong. The public generally sees this annual holiday as a big day for vacation, travel, carnival, pastime, dating or making friends. Halloween decorations on interior and exterior walls of many shopping malls are quickly removed after October 31, and Christmas decorations and lighting are put up in mid-November. The facades of buildings on both sides of Victoria Harbour, Tsim Sha Tsui and Central are all decorated with Christmas lights. Christmas trees can be seen everywhere, and a giant 15-meter-high Christmas tree is erected in the Statue Square, Central. Many citizens start related activities in early December, such as attending Christmas parties, having Christmas dinners and exchanging Christmas gifts. Protestant and Catholic religious leaders in Hong Kong publish Christmas announcements on Christmas Eve. Although December 24, the day before Christmas, is not a holiday, some businesses let employees and bosses off work early, and the stock market only opens in the morning on that day. Christmas Eve at night is the climax of the festive atmosphere. Tsim Sha Tsui, Causeway Bay and Lan Kwai Fong in Central are crowded with people enjoying Christmas lights and carnivals. Churches and chapels hold Midnight Mass that evening, and some Protestants and Catholics attend religious gatherings. Most shops, restaurants and entertainment venues are still open during Christmas, while public transportation, such as the MTR and buses, is available overnight on Christmas Eve. All primary and secondary schools, kindergartens and tertiary institutions in Hong Kong will have Christmas holidays. Most primary and secondary schools usually hold the Christmas Party on December 20 or 21, and then Christmas holidays until New Year's Day, so Christmas and Lunar New Year is the longest consecutive holiday throughout the year except summer vacation. The student organizations of colleges and universities will also hold Christmas parties from mid-December. Students at colleges and universities usually do not need to attend classes from Christmas Day to New Year's Day. Hong Kong citizens use the Christmas holidays to meet friends, family or friends for gatherings, shopping and pastimes, while young people like to spend holidays as a couple or find partners during the holiday, like another Valentine's Day. In addition, people in Hong Kong generally think that Christmas gifts must be opened until Boxing Day on December 26; this day is also referred to as "gift opening day", but in fact, most people open their Christmas gifts as early on Christmas Eve or Christmas morning, and there is no habit of opening Christmas gifts until Boxing Day on the 26th. Some children write to Santa Claus; the letters are sent to the "Undeliverable mail" department of the Post Office, and the staff of the department responds as Santa Claus to each letter. In addition, some people celebrate Christmas with the Winter Solstice until New Year's Day.

Macau 
Christmas is a public holiday in Macau. Its traditions are mostly influenced by the Portuguese since the territory was a colony of Portugal until December 20, 1999. Casinos in Macau remain open on Christmas Day. Christmas masses in Macau's Catholic churches are held in either Chinese or Portuguese.

Japan 

Encouraged by commerce, the secular celebration of Christmas is popular in Japan, though Christmas is not a national holiday. Gifts are sometimes exchanged. Christmas parties are held around Christmas Day; Japanese Christmas cake, a white sponge cake covered with cream and decorated with strawberries, is often consumed and Stollen cake, either imported or made locally, is widely available. Christmas lights decorate cities, and Christmas trees adorn living areas and malls. Christmas Eve has become a holiday for couples to spend time together and exchange gifts. A successful advertising campaign in the 1970s made eating at KFC around Christmas a national custom. Its chicken meals are so popular during the season that stores take reservations months in advance.

History

The first recorded Christmas in Japan was a mass held by Jesuit missionaries in Yamaguchi Prefecture in 1552. Some believe that unrecorded celebrations were held before this date, starting in 1549 when Saint Francis Xavier arrived in Japan. Christianity was banned throughout Japan in 1612. However, a small enclave of Kakure Kirishitan ('hidden Christians') continued to practise underground over the next 250 years.

Christianity in Japan along with Christmas reemerged in the Meiji period. Influenced by America, Christmas parties were held and presents were exchanged. The practice slowly spread, but its proximity to the New Year's celebrations makes it a smaller focus of attention. It became a popular celebration for non-Christians during 1900s after the Russo-Japanese War. During World War II, all celebrations, especially American, were suppressed. From the 1960s, with an expanding economy, and influenced by American TV, Christmas became popular. Many songs and TV series present Christmas as romantic, for example "Last Christmas" by Exile. The birthday of the previous emperor, Akihito, on December 23 is or was a national holiday. Businesses soon close for the New Year's holidays, reopening after January 3.

South Korea 

Christmas is a public holiday in South Korea.

Christmas traditions are generally mixed with Korean culture and cuisine, and Christmas is especially celebrated by the Christian community (Protestants and Catholics alike).

Taiwan 

As only around 5% of the population are actually Christian, Christmas is not usually celebrated as a religious event in Taiwan. Before 2001, December 25 used to be a national holiday, as that was the Constitution Day, the day on which the Constitution of the Republic of China was signed in 1947. In recent years, the secular celebration of Christmas has gained popularity in Taiwan. Christmas parties are held and gifts are sometimes exchanged. Major cities and shopping malls are now decorated with Christmas lights and trees in December to celebrate the festival. One of the most popular Christmas events in Taiwan is Christmasland in New Taipei City organised by the New Taipei City Government, consisting of major Christmas celebration activities and art installations. A series of activities such as the family garden party, Christmas parade carnival and Christmas Eve concert are often held; the programme varies slightly from year to year.

South Asia

Bangladesh 

Pitha, cookies and cake are prepared by Bangladeshi Christians during Christmas. Christmas is a one-day public holiday. On Christmas Eve, churches hold a large dinner called  that includes pulau, egg korma, fish fry and vegetable curries. On Christmas Eve and Christmas morning, prayers are generally held in church. After prayers, carol performances happen. Bengali Christian churches are also decorated with lights and Christmas trees. Some Christians also decorate their homes for celebrations or visits, and give money or toys as gifts to children.

Christmas is also increasingly celebrated by other religions in Bangladesh, especially in urban areas. People celebrate by going to theme parks, zoos and museums, hosting small Christmas parties in restaurants and homes, or with gift-giving.

Bhutan 

Christmas is not an official holiday in Bhutan, in spite of its unusual observance. Despite the country being officially Buddhist, many urban areas in the country are adorned with decorations and shops filled with miniature Santa Clauses.

India 

Being a British colony until 1947, many British traditions stayed on in India. Christmas is a state holiday in India, although Christianity in India is a minority with only 2.3% (of 1.237 billion) of the population. Christians, especially Catholics, attend Midnight Mass. Many Christian houses in India decorate with Christmas cribs and Christmas trees and hang brightly lit stars (symbolising the Bethlehem star) outside their houses. They distribute sweets and cakes to their neighbors. In many schools run by Christian missionaries and in some schools run by other religion trusts(including Hinduism, Islam, etc), the children actively participate in Christmas programs. Many government schools also have a tradition of Christmas celebrations. Christmas is also increasingly celebrated by other religions in India.

Pakistan 

Christianity in Pakistan constitutes the second largest religious minority community in Pakistan after Hindus. The total number of Christians is approximately 2,800,000 in 2008, or 1.6% of the population. Of these, approximately half are Roman Catholic and half Protestant. Christians celebrate Christmas by going from house to house singing carols, and in return the family offers something to the choir. The money collected from such carols is usually used for charity works or is given to the church. Homes are decorated with local Christmas handicrafts while artificial stars signifying the Star of Bethlehem are hung on rooftops. Special foods, such as the Allahabadi fruitcake, are eaten in Pakistan during the Christmas season. Christmas celebrations are also popular with the urban middle class in the country with hotels, cafes, restaurants and theme parks hosting festivities and special events.

Southeast Asia

Brunei 
As of December 22, 2015, Christmas is completely banned in Brunei, but its expatriate and local Christian communities still celebrate it privately amongst themselves. The ban includes putting up Christmas trees, singing Christmas carols, Nativity plays, festive greetings, and even dressing as Santa Claus. Anyone caught will face up to five years in jail. Before the law was passed in 2014, non-Muslim expats were free to celebrate Christmas in Brunei.

Indonesia 

In provinces with a majority or significant Christian population (Protestant and Catholic) such as North Sumatra, Jakarta, West Kalimantan, Central Kalimantan, North Kalimantan, North Sulawesi, West Sulawesi, Central Sulawesi, East Nusa Tenggara, Maluku, the whole Papua Island, and cities like Surabaya, Tangerang, Batam, Bandung, Rantepao, etc., the Christmas season is filled with ceremonies, festivals, and local foods. In big cities, many shopping centres, offices, some roads, and other commercial places feature decorations such as plastic Christmas trees and Sinterklas (derived from the Dutch word Sinterklaas) and his reindeer. Most local television channels broadcast Christmas musical concerts as well as annual national Christmas celebrations like concerts and Christmas shows which are held by the government. Like other countries, on Christmas Eve people go to church for misa and attend again the next morning. Exchanging gifts is a usual tradition for Christians in Indonesia. In addition to traditional foods, Christmas Day generally features cookies, like  (pineapple tart),  (from Dutch ), or putri salju.

Malaysia 

Although Christmas is a public holiday in Malaysia, much of the public celebration is commercial in nature and has no overt religious overtones. Occasionally, Christian activist groups do buy newspaper advertisements on Christmas but this is largely only allowed in English newspapers and permission is not given every year. The advertisements themselves are usually indirect statements. There has been controversy over whether or not the national government has exerted pressure on Malaysian Christians not to use Christian religious symbols and hymns that specifically mention Jesus Christ.

However, in East Malaysia, which covers northern Borneo, Christmas is a huge celebration due to large number of indigenous people who practise Christianity.

Celebrations in Christian majority districts in the states of Sabah and Sarawak can last until after New Year's Day with families and political leaders hosting Open Houses, namely parties which are open to anyone.

Drinking of alcohol is widespread during this period and a call by a Muslim political party to ban alcohol was met with widespread outrage.

Philippines 

Christmas in the Philippines, one of two predominantly Catholic countries in Asia (the other being East Timor), is one of the biggest holidays on the calendar and is widely celebrated. The country has earned the distinction of celebrating the world's longest Christmas season, with Christmas carols heard as early as September 1 when the Ber Months season traditionally begins. The season is officially ushered in by the nine-day dawn masses that start on December 16. Usually, aside from the already legal holidays which are Rizal Day (December 30) and New Year's Eve (December 31), other days in close proximity such as Christmas Eve (December 24),  (December 28), and Epiphany (traditionally, January 6 but now on the first Sunday of January) are also declared non-working days.

As in many East Asian countries, secular Christmas displays are common both in business establishments and in public, including lights, Christmas trees, depictions of Santa Claus despite the tropical climate, and Christmas greetings in various foreign languages and various Philippine languages. Occasionally such displays are left in place even in summer, for example the parol, representing the Star of Bethlehem which led the Three Kings to the newborn Baby Jesus.

For Filipinos, Christmas Eve on December 24 is celebrated with the Midnight Mass, and immediately after, the much-anticipated  – the traditional Christmas Eve feast. Family members dine together around 12 midnight on traditional  fare, which may include: queso de bola (English: 'ball of cheese'; this is actually edam cheese),  (a hot chocolate drink), and jamón (Christmas ham), lechón, roast chicken or turkey, pasta,  (stuffed bangus or chicken), pan de sal, and various desserts including cakes and the ubiquitous fruit salad. Some also open presents at this time.

In spite of the campaign against firecrackers, many Filipinos still see these as the traditional means to greet the New Year. The loud noises and sounds of merrymaking are also supposed to drive away bad spirits. Safer methods of merrymaking include banging on pots and pans and blowing on car horns. Folk beliefs also include encouraging children to jump at the stroke of midnight in the belief that they will grow up tall, displaying circular fruit and wearing clothes with dots and other circular designs to symbolize money, eating twelve grapes at 12 midnight for good luck in the twelve months of the year, and opening windows and doors during the first day of the New Year to let in good luck.

The Feast of the Three Kings was traditionally commemorated on January 6 but is now celebrated on the first Sunday after the New Year. Some children leave their shoes out in the belief that the Three Kings will leave gifts like candy or money inside. But the celebrations do not end there, since 2011, as mandated by the Catholic Church, they are on either the second Sunday of January or Monday after Epiphany in honor of the Lord Jesus's baptism in the Jordan (the Solemnity of the Lord's Baptism, or in Spanish ). The final salvo of these celebrations is marked by the feast of the Black Nazarene every January 9 in Manila and Cagayan de Oro, but can also, due to the celebrations in honor of the Santo Niño on the third and fourth Sundays of January in some places, even extend till the final weeks of that month.

Singapore 

Christmas is a public holiday in Singapore that is widely celebrated. The Christmas season is also a popular period for shopping centres and businesses to conduct year-end sales and offer discounts and promotions that tie in with the festivities. The famous Singaporean shopping belt, Orchard Road, as well as the Marina Bay area, feature lights and other decorations from early November till early January. The Christmas light-up and decorated shopping malls along Orchard Road often attract numerous visitors, locals and tourists alike. Other than the light-up, other activities such as caroling, concerts and parades can also be experienced in Orchard Road. In addition, companies in Singapore usually arrange gift exchange programs on the last working day before Christmas.

Thailand 

Christmas is not an official public holiday in Thailand and the majority of the population adheres to Theravada Buddhism, however it is celebrated by the Catholic and Protestant Christians of the country, as well as expats.

Vietnam 
Christmas is not a national holiday but is becoming increasingly popular in Vietnam due to increasing exposure to Western culture and its non-religious glamour and commercial appeal. Vietnamese may be more accepting of corporate influence because for many, Christmas was never based on personal values to begin with. It is not a time to have dinner at home with family and show thanks for one another. Instead, it is a time to go out on the town, shop, and take pictures with friends in front of colorful displays, especially on December 24. This is the second most popular holiday after Vietnamese New Year, which occurs around one month after Christmas.

Christmas is reported to be banned in Vietnam's Central Highlands, and in some cases observers have reported harassment by authorities including accusations of "attempting to overthrow" the regime.

West Asia

Armenia 
Armenians usually celebrate Christmas on January 6. The reason for this unusual date emerges from ancient history. "In the fourth century Roman Catholic Church, officials established the date of Christmas as December 25th." Before that time, Armenians celebrated Christmas (meaning 'Holy Birth') on January 6 as a public holiday in Armenia. It also coincides with the Epiphany. The Armenians denied the new Roman mandate regarding Christmas, and continued to celebrate both the Nativity and Jesus' baptism on January 6. When the Gregorian calendar was implemented in 1582, the Armenians rejected the reformed calendar and continued to follow the Julian Calendar. Today, only the Armenian Patriarchate of Jerusalem still uses the Julian Calendar. Since the Julian calendar is thirteen days behind the Gregorian calendar, when the Armenians of Jerusalem celebrate Christmas on January 6 according to the Julian calendar, the Gregorian calendar counts the day as January 19.

Traditionally, Armenians fast during the week leading up to Christmas, avoiding all meat, eggs, and dairy products. Devout Armenians may even refrain from food for the three days leading up to Christmas Eve in order to receive the Eucharist on a "pure" stomach. Christmas Eve is particularly rich in traditions. Families gather for the Christmas Eve dinner, which generally consists of rice, fish,  (a vegetable dish of green chard and chick peas), and yogurt/wheat soup. Dessert includes dried fruits and nuts, including , which consists of whole shelled walnuts threaded on a string and encased in grape jelly,  (a paper-like confection of grape jelly, cornstarch, and flour), etc. This lighter menu is designed to ease the stomach off the week-long fast and prepare it for the rather more substantial Christmas Day dinner. Children take presents of fruits, nuts, and other candies to older relatives. "On the eve of the Feast of the Nativity and Theophany of The Lord Jesus Christ, the Jrakalouyts Divine Liturgy (the lighting of the lamps service) is celebrated in honor of the manifestation of Jesus as the Son of God (theophany)". In addition to the Christmas tree, Armenians (particularly in the Middle East) also erect the Nativity scene. Christmas in the Armenian tradition is a purely religious affair. Santa Claus does not visit the nice Armenian children on Christmas, but rather on New Year's Eve. The idea of Santa Claus existed before the Soviet Union and he was named  , but the Soviet Union had a great impact even on Santa Claus. Now he goes by the more secular name of Grandfather Winter.

Assyrians 

The Assyrians, the indigenous people of northwestern Iran, northern Iraq, northeastern Syria, and southeastern Turkey that belong to the Assyrian Church of the East, Ancient Church of the East, Syriac Orthodox Church, and Chaldean Catholic Church today celebrate Christmas on December 25. Assyrians colloquially call Christmas Eda Zora, meaning 'little holiday.' It is officially called Eda d'Yalde which means 'birthday holiday.' Traditionally, Assyrians fast (sawma) from December 1 until Christmas Day. In Iraq, for instance, on Christmas Eve, Assyrian families congregate outside of their house and hold lighted candles while a child reads aloud the nativity story. Then they all sing psalms over a bonfire made of thorn bushes. Folklore says that if the thorns burn to ashes, the family will have good luck. After the fire has been reduced to ashes, the family members will jump three times over the ashes and make a wish. The next day, on Christmas, "as another bonfire burns in the churchyard, the bishops lead the service while carrying a figure of the baby Jesus. He blesses one person with a touch. That person touches the next person and the touch passes around until all have felt the touch of peace." Many Assyrians will attend the Shaharta, or midnight vigil before Christmas. On Christmas Day, when families gather together after the Shaharta or morning mass, raza d'mowlada d'maran, the fast is broken by eating traditional Assyrian foods such as pacha/reesh-aqle (meaning 'from the head to the tail'), which is a boiled soup made of sheep or cow intestines, tongue, stomach, legs, and spices or harissa, a porridge made of ground wheat and chicken (both dishes are prepared usually overnight). These two dishes are only made twice a year: on Christmas and Easter. Traditional desserts eaten after the main course include killeche, a date and walnut-stuffed cookie, and kadeh, another stuffed pastry. After the feast is finished, Assyrians will visit the houses of family and friends to exchange Christmas greetings, saying, "Eedokhon breekha," meaning "May your feast be blessed." There, the host will serve tea, Turkish coffee, and killeche and kadeh to guests. Although Christmas is celebrated in a much more religious fashion, in recent years, families put up a small Christmas tree in the house.

Lebanon 
Christmas is an official holiday in Lebanon. The Lebanese celebrate Christmas on December 25, except for Armenian Lebanese Christians who celebrate Christmas on January 6 (also an official holiday in Lebanon). Lebanese families come together and butcher a sheep for a Christmas Eve feast in honor of the birth of "the shepherd" Jesus Christ. On that night the head of the house passes around a piece of coal representing the sins before Christ. After the piece of coal has been passed around it is then set on fire. After Dinner, Lebanese Christians attend midnight mass. Santa Claus is known by the French name . Gifts are either dropped off at church or  makes a personal appearance at the home.

Jordan 

Jordanian Christians observe Christmas on December 25. The Muslim majority of Jordan also take part in Christmas as a holiday, and during this time shops and streets in Jordan are colorfully decorated.

Iraq 
Christmas is celebrated by Christians in Iraq, and in 2018 it was declared an official state holiday for the first time. In recent years, an increasing amount of Muslims have also started celebrating Christmas as a secular holiday.

Europe

Central Europe 

In countries of Central Europe (for this purpose, roughly defined as the German-speaking countries of Germany, Austria and Switzerland as well as the Czech Republic, Poland, Slovakia, Slovenia, Hungary and possibly other places) the main celebration date for the general public is Christmas Eve (December 24). The day is usually a fasting day; in some places children are told they will see a golden pig if they hold fast until after dinner. When the evening comes, preparation of Christmas dinner starts. Traditions concerning dinner vary from region to region; for example, in Poland, the Czech Republic, and Slovakia, the prevailing meal is fried carp with potato salad and fish (or cabbage) soup. However, in some places the tradition is porridge with mushrooms (a modest dish), and elsewhere the dinner is exceptionally rich, with up to 12 dishes. When Christmas comes around, children may receive presents from neighbours and house guests. House pets may also receive gifts.

After the dinner comes the time for gifts. Children usually find their gifts under the Christmas tree, with name stickers. An interesting example of the complicated history of the region is the "fight" between Christmas beings. During communism, when countries of Central Europe were under Soviet influence, communist authorities strongly pushed the Russian Ded Moroz ('Grandfather Frost') in the place of Little Jesus. Now Santa Claus is gaining popularity, by means of advertising and Hollywood film production. Many people, Christians as well as people with just a Christian background, go to Roman Catholic Midnight Mass.

Other common attributes of Christmas in Central Europe include Christmas trees, mistletoe, Christmas garlands, and Bethlehem cribs.

In many areas of Central Europe, St. Nicholas, or Santa Claus, does not come for Christmas. He visits families earlier, on the dawn of St. Nicholas Day on December 6, and for the well-behaved children he has presents and candy-bags to put into their well polished shoes that were set in the windows the previous evening. Although he neither parks his sleigh on rooftops nor climbs chimneys, his visits are usually accompanied by a diabolic-looking servant named Krampusz (in Austria, Slovenia, and Croatia, Krampus; in Czech and Slovak regions he is simply , i.e. 'devil', without any name) who gives golden coloured birches for so called badly behaved children. Actually all children get both gifts and golden birches in their shoes, no matter how they behaved themselves.

Austria and Germany 

In some German-speaking communities, particularly in Catholic regions of western and southern Germany, Switzerland, Austria, South Tyrol and Liechtenstein, as well as in other Catholic regions of Central Europe, the Christkind (literally 'Christ child') brings the presents on the evening of December 24 ('Holy Evening' or ). The Christkind is invisible; thus he is never seen by anyone. However, he rings a bell just before he leaves in order to let children know that the Christmas tree and the presents are ready.

It is a tradition to lavishly decorate a Christmas tree in the days directly before Christmas or on the morning of Christmas Eve. Late on Christmas Eve, after the bell rings, the tree is shown to the children and presents are exchanged.

In Protestant churches, there is a service in the late afternoon intended to immediately precede the Christmas Eve meal and the exchanging of gifts. In some regions the tradition of Quempas singing is still popular. Some Lutheran churches also celebrate a candlelight service at midnight besides the Christmas Vespers in the afternoon or early evening.

Many Catholic churches also have a first Mass of Christmas, called , on  about 4 p.m. for the children and parents to attend before the families return home for their meal. The crib is a very important part of the celebrations in Catholic areas, especially Bavaria.

Austria 

In the largely Catholic Austria, Christmas markets are a long-standing tradition. In Vienna, for instance, one of the 20 so-called  (sing. ) is held in the large square in front of City Hall. Innsbruck opens its romantic Christmas market in the narrow medieval square at the foot of the Golden Roof. In Salzburg, the Christmas market takes over the square in front of the cathedral with its picturesque stalls, while the tree vendors occupy Residenzplatz on the side of the huge Cathedral. However, almost every small town has its own Christmas market.

In Austria, Christmas trees play a very important part in Christmas celebrations. Every town sets up its own huge tree on the main square all decorated with electric candles, ornaments and various decorations resembling candies or other sweets and frequently there will be an extra one, adorned with bread crumbs, for the birds. In families the tree is decorated with gold and silver ornaments or stars made out of straw, sweets and candy wrapped in tinfoil, gilded nuts, etc.

The feast of St Nicholas marks the beginning of Christmas in Austria. On Christmas Eve (December 24) the tree is lit for the first time and the whole family gathers to sing Christmas carols like "" ("Silent Night"). Gifts that are placed under the tree are opened after dinner on Christmas Eve. Austrian Christmas tradition has it that it is the Christ Child himself who decorates the Christmas tree on Christmas Eve and brings the children their Christmas presents, and it is to him that their letters and wish lists are addressed in the weeks before Christmas. The Christmas Eve dinner is the main event of the night often served with fried carp. Vanillekipferl are a common confectionary served during Christmas time, along with Zimtsterne, macaroons, and various kinds of gingerbread.

Germany 

In Germany, Christmas traditions vary by region. Until the Reformation, Saint Nicholas Day was celebrated on December 6, and Saint Nicholas was the main provider of Christmas presents. Nicholas still puts goodies in children's shoes on that day. Sometimes St. Nicholas visits children in kindergarten, schools or at public events. They have to recite a short poem or sing a song in order to get sweets or a small gift. "Knecht Ruprecht" ('the servant Ruprecht') – dressed in dark clothes with devil-like traits (usually noted as a long, bright red tongue and with a stick or a small whip in the hand) – sometimes accompanies St. Nicholas. His duty is to punish those children who have not behaved during the year. Usually he merely stands near St. Nicholas as a warning to be good and polite. Nikolaus as well for some Glühwein for adults; there are also traditions connected with local firefighters, riders' associations and church congregations.

Similar to Saint Nicholas, smaller presents like sweets are given and blessings provided; however, she remains silent. Another tradition in Saxony is related to the wooden toymaking in the Ore Mountains, especially Seiffen, which produces Christmas decorations such as the Christmas pyramid as well as toys year-round. Christmas letters may be addressed e.g. to Engelskirchen ('Angel's church') or Himmelpforten ('Heaven's gate') or other municipalities with similar names. After privatization, Deutsche Post kept the tradition of dedicated Christmas offices, one in each state, answering letters and requests from children.

Currently the actual Christmas gift-giving usually takes place on Christmas Eve. This tradition was introduced by Reformer Martin Luther, as he was of the opinion that one should put the emphasis on Christ's birth and not on a saint's day and do away with the connotation that gifts have to be earned by good behavior. The gifts should be seen as a symbol for the gift of God's grace in Christ. This tradition quickly became common in predominantly Catholic regions as well.

Until 1930, there was sort a north–south divide between the realms of the southern and Silesian  and the Nordic . After the gifts are opened the children often stay up as late as they like, often till the early hours of the morning.

The Christmas tree is first put up and decorated on the morning of the 24th. The gifts are then placed under the tree. Christmas services in the church serve as well to exchange greetings with neighbors and friends. After an evening meal one of the parents usually goes into the room where the tree is standing, lights the candles and rings a little bell. Then the children are allowed to go into the candlelit room. In many families it is still customary to sing Christmas songs around the tree before opening the presents. Some families attend a midnight church service, after the evening meal and gift-giving.

The culinary feast either takes place at supper on Christmas Eve or on the first day of Christmas. Traditions vary from region to region; carp is eaten in many parts of the country. Potato salad with frankfurter or wiener sausages is popular in some families. Another simple meal which some families favor, especially in regions where Christmas Eve still has the character of a fast day, is vegetable or pea soup. In some regions, especially in Schleswig-Holstein where Danish influence is noticeable, a roasted duck or goose filled with plums, apples and raisins is family tradition. In other regions, especially in Mecklenburg and Pomerania, many families prefer kale with boiled potatoes, special sausages and ham. Many families have developed new traditions for themselves and eat such meals as meat fondue or raclette. Many families in all parts of Germany bake a wide variety of Christmas cookies according to recipes typical for the family and the region.

 describes the hunting and forestry custom of providing a Christmas tree with food decorated for animals.

Czech Republic and Slovakia 

Christmas Eve (December 24) is celebrated as /, which means 'Generous Day', and gifts are given in the evening. December 25 and 26 are public holidays in the Czech Republic and in Slovakia, but / (Christmas) is most commonly associated with the 24th.

According to tradition, gifts are brought by /, or 'Baby Jesus'. Fish soup and breaded roasted carp with special homemade potato salad are a traditional dish for the dinner. In Slovakia, before eating, everyone exchanges Christmas greetings with each other by sharing a piece of Christmas wafer with honey and walnuts. The components of a traditional dinner depend on the region, but one common Christmas dinner is cabbage soup or lentil soup and breaded roasted carp with homemade potato salad or handmade gnocchi with poppy. The gifts are surreptitiously placed under the Christmas tree (usually a spruce or pine and lately fir), usually just before or during dinner. Children have to wait for the ringing of a Christmas bell, one of the decorations on the Christmas tree – the sign that / (little Jesus) has just passed by – to run for the presents. That happens at the end of their Christmas dinner. There is a rich tradition of hard baked Christmas sweets (/).

Other Czech and Slovak Christmas traditions involve predictions for the future. Apples are always cut crosswise: if a perfect star appears in the core, the next year will be successful, while a distorted star means a bad year or illness, and a cross may suggest death. Girls throw shoes over their shoulders – if the toe points to the door, the girl will get married soon. Another tradition requires pouring some molten lead into water and guessing a message from its shapes.

In Catholic Slovakia, the tradition of Jasličkári involves young men dressed as shepherds or angels visiting their neighbors and presenting recitations and songs about the story of the birth of Jesus.

Hungary 

The Christmas and gift-giving season starts relatively early compared to other cultures, with the Santa-like figure, or Hungarian version of Saint Nicholas, Mikulás (or Szent Miklós) traditionally visiting the homes of Hungarian children on the night of December 5, on the eve of Saint Nicholas Feast Day, December 6.

Although the role of gift-giver on Christmas Day itself is assigned to the Christ Child, on the night before St. Nicholas Day Hungarian children traditionally place a boot on their windowsill waiting for Mikulás to come by and fill it with treats. In Hungary, celebrations begin with Christmas tree decoration and gift wrapping during the day on December 24; then comes a family dinner with traditional Christmas meals. In some parts of Hungary, a traditional fish soup, is served at the Christmas Eve meal, although it is also consumed at other times of the year. The day is otherwise a fast day.

This is the most intimate moment of Christmas, featuring a warmly lit Christmas tree and candles, soft Christmas music, family singing of Christmas or religious songs and gift opening. Nativity plays, called 'playing Bethlehem' or ) are commonly put on by children and adults. A Christmas crib and a church are used as the scene. The actors go from house to house, and they receive gifts for their performance.

Poland 

In the largely Roman Catholic Poland, Christmas Eve begins with a day of fasting and then a night of feasting. The traditional Christmas meal is known as Wigilia ('The Vigil'), and being invited to attend a  dinner with a family is considered a high honour.
On that evening, children watch the sky anxiously hoping to be the first to cry out, "The star has come!" After the appearance of the first star is declared, the family sits down at the dinner table.

According to tradition, bits of hay are spread beneath the tablecloth as a reminder that Christ was born in a manger. Others partake in the practice of placing money under the table cloth for each guest, in order to wish for prosperity in the coming year. The dinner contains twelve dishes, one for each Apostle. In many homes, an extra place setting is set. The empty setting is symbolically left at the table for a lonely wanderer who may be in need of food, an angel, the Baby Jesus or the Holy Spirit should appear to share the feast.

Before eating, everyone exchanges Christmas greetings with each other. The supper begins with the breaking of the opłatek (Christmas wafer), in which everyone at the table breaks off a piece and eats it as a symbol of their unity with Christ. The  is usually blessed by the presiding bishop, and stamped with a religious image such as the Nativity scene. A tradition exists among some families to serve twelve different dishes at  symbolizing the Twelve Apostles, or perhaps, an odd number of dishes for good luck (usually five, seven, or nine). Some practice the superstition that an even number of people must be seated around the table.

A traditional  supper in Poland includes fried carp and barszcz (beetroot soup) with uszka (translated as 'little ears', also known as meatless ravioli). The most common dishes are fish soup, with potato salad, pierogi, gołąbki filled with kasza, pickled herring and fruit kompot.
Carp provides a main component of the Christmas Eve meal across Poland: carp fillet, carp in aspic etc. Universal Polish Christmas foods are pierogi as well as some herring dishes, herring fillets, herring in aspic and for dessert, makowiec or noodles with poppy seeds. Often, there is a compote of dry fruits for a drink. Dishes beside fish are usually cabbage-, forest mushroom- (like Boletus) and poppy seed-based, with herring being very important. After supper the Star Man arrives attended by the Star Boys. They are dressed as Wise Men or animals or other figures. The Star Man examines the children in their catechism and rewards them with small presents if they do well, even if they need a bit of coaching. The Star Boys sing carols and are given a treat for their help. The feast begins with the appearance of the first star. The meal is followed by the exchange of gifts.
The remainder of the evening is given to stories and songs around the Christmas tree. In some areas of the country, children are taught that the "Little Star" brings the gifts. As presents are unwrapped, carollers may walk from house to house receiving treats along the way.

Christmas Eve ends with Pasterka, the Midnight Mass at the local church. The tradition commemorates the arrival of the Three Wise Men to Bethlehem and their paying of respect and bearing witness to the newborn Messiah. The custom of Christmas night liturgy was introduced in the Christian churches after the second half of the 5th century. In Poland that custom arrived together with the coming of Christianity. The next day (December 25) begins with the early morning mass followed by daytime masses. According to scripture, the Christmas Day masses are interchangeable allowing for greater flexibility in choosing the religious services by individual parishioners.

The following day is often spent visiting friends. The giftbearer varies.

Romania and Moldova 

Christmas in Romania is on December 25 and is generally considered the second most important religious Romanian holiday after Easter. In Moldova, although Christmas is celebrated on December 25 like in Romania, January 7 is also recognized as an official holiday. Celebrations begin with the decoration of the Christmas tree during daytime on December 24, and in the evening (Christmas Eve,)  (Father Christmas) delivers the presents.

The singing of carols is a very important part of Romanian Christmas festivities. On the first day of Christmas, many carolers walk through the streets of the towns and villages, holding a star made of cardboard and paper on which are depicted various scenes from the Bible. Romanian tradition has the smallest children going from house to house, singing carols and reciting poems and legends during the whole Christmas season. The leader of the group carries with him a star made of wood, covered with metal foil and decorated with bells and coloured ribbons. An image of the Nativity is painted on the star's centre, and this piece of handiwork is attached to the end of a broom or other long stick.

Romanian food served during the holidays is a hearty multi-coursed meal, most of which consists of pork (organs, muscle, and fat). This is mainly a symbolic gesture for St. Ignatius of Antioch.

Eastern Europe 

Since the 1880s, the Christmas customs of the Eastern Slavic countries have included a similar character known as Ded Moroz ('Grandfather Frost'). According to legend, he travels in a magical sanki — a decorated sleigh drawn by reindeer (or three white horses). With his young, blonde assistant Snegurochka (the 'Snow Maiden', said to be his granddaughter) at his side, he visits homes and gives gifts to good children (not true for former Yugoslavian countries). He only delivers presents to children while they are asleep, and unlike Santa, he does not travel down chimneys, coming instead to the front door of children's homes. However, in Russia, children receive presents on New Year's Day; Christmas is solely celebrated by Christians and on January 7.

This Ded Moroz is not identified nor in any way associated with Saint Nicholas of Myra (feast day, December 6), who is very widely revered in Eastern Europe for his clerical and charitable works as a bishop. In all likelihood, Ded Moroz is actually in Slavic tradition like Santa Claus, any connection to the original saint having long since disappeared.

Georgia 

On calendars in Georgia, Christmas is celebrated on January 7 (December 25 on the Julian calendar). It is traditional in Georgia to go on Alilo (a modified pronunciation of alleluia), a mass walk in the streets, dressed in special clothing to celebrate and congratulate each other. Most members of the Alilo march are children and they are given sweets by the adults. The Alilo carols vary across the provinces of Georgia. In most songs these words are used: "" – 'on December 25 Christ was born in Bethlehem'. A local variant of the Christmas tree, called chichilaki, is made of soft wooden material with curled branches. Sometimes it is made of hazelnut branches carved into a Tree of Life-like shape and decorated with fruits and sweets. The Western custom of a Christmas tree is also popular and has been imported through Russia.

Russia 

As in some other Eastern Orthodox countries, and due to the 13-day difference between the newer Gregorian calendar and the older Julian calendars, Christmas is celebrated on January 7. Unlike its Western counterparts, Christmas is mainly a religious event in Russia. On Christmas Eve (January 6), there are several long services, including the Royal Hours and Vespers combined with the Divine Liturgy. The family will then return home for the traditional Christmas Eve "Holy Supper", which consists of 12 dishes, one to honor each of the Twelve Apostles. On Christmas morning the  – Divine Liturgy of the Nativity – is held, and families return to their local churches to attend. Since 1992 Christmas has become a national holiday in Russia, as part of the ten-day holiday at the start of every new year.

During the Soviet period, religious celebrations were discouraged by the officially atheist state. Christmas trees and related celebrations were gradually eradicated after the October Revolution. In 1935, in a surprising turn of state politics, the Christmas tradition was adopted as part of the secular New Year celebration. Many of these were brought to Russia by Peter the Great after his Western travels in the late 17th century. 

Christmas is known as Quviasukvik in the federal subject of Chukotka, and is marked by the Chukchi, the Yupik and the Aleut as their New Year on December 24.

Ukraine 

Sviata Vecheria or 'Holy Supper' is the central tradition of the Christmas Eve celebrations in Ukrainian homes and takes place in most parts of the country on January 6. In Western Ukraine, especially in Carpathian Ruthenia, due to historical multi-culturism, Christmas can be observed twice—on December 25 and January 7, often irrespective of whether the family belongs to Ukrainian Greek Catholic Church, the Roman Catholic Church, one of the Ukrainian Orthodox Churches, or one of the Protestant denominations. The Western Ukrainian tradition of two Christmas celebrations, since 2017, is also celebrated nationwide as well. 

When the children see the first star in the eastern evening sky, which symbolizes the trek of the Three Wise Men, the  may begin. In city homes a few stalks of golden wheat in a vase are often used to decorate the table. The dinner table sometimes has a few wisps of hay on the embroidered tablecloth as a reminder of the manger in Bethlehem. In some families the Old Slavic form  is used. At the end of the  the family often sings Ukrainian Christmas carols. In many communities the old Ukrainian tradition of caroling is carried on by groups of young people and members of organizations and churches calling at homes and collecting donations.

Traditionally, Christmas Day opens for Ukrainian families with attendance in church services (Mass, worship service or Divine Liturgy). Ukrainian churches offer services starting before midnight on Christmas Eve and on Christmas morning. The old tradition in Ukraine of giving gifts to children on St. Nicholas Day, December 19, has generally been replaced by the Christmas date and it is Father Frost who visits all the children in a sleigh pulled by only three reindeer. (In Western Ukraine the St. Nicholas Day is marked there on December 6.)

Northern Europe 

In much of Northern Europe Christmas is celebrated on December 24 and is referred to as jul (see Yule), while December 25 is a relaxed day for visiting relatives. The Norse believed that the sun was a great wheel of fire that rolled towards and then away from the earth.

Denmark 

An evening meal with the family consists of either roast pork, roast duck or roast goose and eaten with potatoes, plenty of gravy, and red cabbage or finely chopped kale boiled in butter. Caramelized potatoes are also an important part of the Danish Christmas dinner. For dessert rice pudding is traditionally served – composed largely of whipped cream and accompanied by lashings of black cherry sauce. The rice pudding also contains chopped peeled almonds, and a single whole peeled almond. Whoever finds the whole almond will have good luck for the coming year, and the lucky finder is entitled to a small gift, .
After the meal is complete, the family gathers around the Christmas tree and sings Christmas songs and hymns while holding hands and dancing in circles, and may even tour the house, still holding hands and singing. When the singing is complete, traditions vary. In some traditions, the family will select one child to hand out the presents. All children take turns handing out presents in other traditions.
Alternatively "Santa Claus", Julemanden, will appear at the door in full costume with a large sack of presents over his shoulder. He will then distribute the presents, with the assistance of any children present, to their recipients. He should be offered suitable drink to keep him warm and cheerful on his onward journey, but do not expect loquacity – utterances are normally limited to loud and hearty laughs. Meanwhile, the presents are opened and this is followed by more snacks, candy, chips and, sometimes, a traditional Christmas drink called gløgg.

The Danish are somewhat famous for their  (pl. ), literally meaning 'Christmas lunch', which includes various traditional Danish dishes, potentially accompanied by beer and snaps. These  are popular and held within families, as well as by companies and other social groups. They would traditionally have taken place leading up to Christmas, but due to time constraints and stress during the Christmas month they are nowadays commonly held during November and January as well. The family , however, are normally held on Christmas Day and/or the Second day of Christmas (December 26).

Several television stations produce their own, most, but not all of which are targeted at child viewers. Some of the television advent calendars become extremely popular and go on to be reprised in subsequent years.

In some traditions, to maintain the favour and protection of these , children leave out saucers of milk or rice pudding or other treats for them and are delighted to find the food gone on Christmas morning.

Estonia 

Each year on this day, the President of Estonia declares the Christmas Peace and attends a Christmas service. The tradition was initiated by the order of Queen Christina of Sweden in the 17th century. Estonian children are visited by jõuluvana ('Santa Claus') on Christmas Eve, and must sing songs or recite Christmas poems before receiving their gifts.

The evening meal typically includes pork with sauerkraut or Estonian sauerkraut with pork and barley, baked potatoes, white and blood sausage, potato salad with red beet, and pâté. For dessert, Estonians eat gingerbread and marzipan. Estonians leave the leftover food from Christmas dinner on the table overnight, in hopes that the spirits of family, friends, and loved ones will visit and also have something to eat. It is also customary to visit graveyards and leave candles for the deceased.

Finland 

Christmas is an extensively prepared celebration centering on the family and home, although it has a religious dimension also. The Christmas season starts from December or even in late November, when shops began advertising potential Christmas gifts. Christmas decorations and songs become more prominent as Christmas nears, and children count days to Christmas with Advent calendars. Schools and some other places have the day before Christmas Eve (December 23) as a holiday, but at the latest on Christmas Eve (December 24), shops close early and stay closed until December 26. The main Christmas festivities are held on Christmas Eve on December 24, while Christmas Day and the following day ('St. Stephen's Day') are mandatory public holidays in Finland. Schools continue holidays up to the New Year.

The Declaration of Christmas Peace has been a tradition in Finland from the Middle Ages every year, except in 1939 due to the Winter War. It is a custom in many towns and cities. The most famous one of these declarations is on the Old Great Square of Turku, the former capital of Finland, at noon on Christmas Eve. It is broadcast on Finnish radio (since 1935) and television, and nowadays also in some foreign countries. The declaration ceremony begins with the hymn  (Martin Luther's A Mighty Fortress Is Our God) by a band of the Finnish Navy and a male choir and continues with the Declaration of Christmas Peace read from a parchment roll, in both Finnish and Swedish, the country's two official languages:

 Tomorrow, God willing, is the most gracious feast of the birth of our Lord and Saviour, and therefore a general Christmas peace is hereby declared, and all persons are directed to observe this holiday with due reverence and otherwise quietly and peacefully to conduct themselves, for whosoever breaks this peace and disturbs the Christmas holiday by any unlawful or improper conduct shall be liable, under aggravating circumstances, to whatever penalty is prescribed by law and decree for each particular offence or misdemeanour. Finally, all citizens are wished a joyous Christmas holiday.

The ceremony ends with the Finnish national anthem Maamme and Porilaisten marssi played by the band, with the crowd usually singing when the band plays . Recently, there is also a declaration of Christmas peace for forest animals in many cities and municipalities, so there is no hunting during Christmas.

Finnish people clean their homes well before Christmas and prepare special treats for the festive season. A sheaf of grain, nuts and seeds are tied on a pole, which is placed in the garden for the birds to feed on. Spruce trees are cut or bought from a market and taken to homes on or a few days before Christmas Eve and are decorated. Candles are lit on the Christmas tree, which is traditionally decorated using apples and other fruit, candies, paper flags, cotton and tinsel, in addition to Christmas ornaments such as stars or baubles. Actual candles are no longer used, being replaced by incandescent or LED lamps. A star symbolizing the Star of Bethlehem is placed at the top of the tree. Just before the Christmas festivities begin, people usually take a Christmas sauna. The tradition is very old; unlike on normal days, when one would go to the sauna in the evening, on Christmas Eve it is done before sunset. This tradition is based on a pre-20th century belief that the spirits of the dead return and have a sauna at the usual sauna hours.

Afterwards, they dress up in clean clothes for the Christmas dinner or joulupöytä, which is usually served between 5 p.m. and 7 p.m., or traditionally with the appearance of the first star in the sky. The most traditional dish of the Finnish Christmas dinner is probably Christmas ham, roast suckling pig or a roasted fresh ham, but some may prefer alternatives like turkey. Several sorts of casseroles, like rutabaga, carrot and potato casserole are traditional, and are almost always exclusively served on Christmas. Other traditional Christmas dishes include boiled codfish (soaked beforehand in a lye solution for a week to soften it) served snowy white and fluffy, pickled herring and vegetables. Prune jam pastries, plum or mixed fruit soup, rice porridge with cinnamon, sugar and cold milk, and sweets like chocolate are popular desserts. Christmas gifts are usually exchanged after Christmas Eve dinner. Children do not hang up stockings in Finland but Joulupukki visits the household, maybe with a tonttu to help him distribute the presents.

Christmas Day services begin early at six in the morning and people visit families and reunions are arranged on this day.

Iceland 

The Christmas or Yule (Jól in Icelandic) celebration in Iceland starts four Sundays before Christmas proper, which begins on December 24 (Advent) and ends thirteen days later on January 6. Traditionally, one candle is lit each Sunday until four candles are lit on the 24th. At 6:00 pm church bells ring to start the Christmas celebration. The religiously observant and/or traditional Icelanders will attend mass at this time while the secular Icelanders will begin their holiday meal immediately. After the meal is finished, they open gifts and spend the evening together. In Iceland people over the Yule holidays most often eat smoked lamb, ptarmigan and turkey. Pork is also very popular.

Thirteen days before December 24, children will leave their shoes by the window so that the Yule Lads can leave small gifts in their shoes. The Yule Lads are the sons of two trolls living in the Icelandic mountains. Each of the Yule Lads is known for a different kind of mischief (for example slamming doors, stealing meat, stealing milk or stealing the candles). The Yule Lads traditionally wear early Icelandic wool clothing but are now known for the more recognizable red and white suit.

Each home typically sets up a Christmas tree indoors in the living room with most decorating it on December 11. In addition to the decorations, presents are put underneath the tree. It is also a tradition in many homes to boil skate on the 23rd. The day is called Saint Thorlak Mass.

During the holiday season, it is traditional for families to work together to bake small cookies to serve or give to guests. Most common are thin gingerbread cookies which are decorated in many different colors of glaze. Many families also follow the tradition of making  ('leafbread'), which is a flat thin bread that is cut out using a special tool and folding technique.

The end of year is divided between two days – the Old Year's Day and the New Year's Day. At the night of the former and morning of the latter Icelanders shoot up fireworks blowing the old year away and welcoming the new one.

Thirteen days after the 24th Icelanders say goodbye to the Yule Lads and other mystical creatures such as elves and trolls. There are bonfires held throughout the country while the elves, Yule Lads, and Icelanders dance together before saying goodbye until the next Christmas.

Norway 

The major day of celebration in Norway, as in most of Northern Europe, is December 24. Although it is legally a regular workday until 4:00 p.m., most stores close early. Church bells chime in the Christmas holiday between 5:00 p.m. and 6:00 p.m. In some families, the Christmas story from Luke 2 will be read from the old family Bible. The main Christmas meal is served in the evening. Common main dishes include pork rib, pinnekjøtt (pieces of lamb rib steamed on a grid of birch wood). Many people also eat lutefisk or fresh, poached cod. Rice porridge is also popular (but most commonly served as an early lunch rather than for the main Christmas dinner), an almond is often hidden in the porridge, and the person who finds it wins a treat or small gift. In some parts of Norway it is common to place porridge outside (in a barn, outhouse or even in the forest) to please . In many families, where the parents grew up with different traditions, two different main dishes are served to please everyone. If children are present (and they have behaved well the last year),  (Santa Claus) pays a visit, otherwise gifts are stored under the Christmas tree.

For a lot of Norwegians, especially families, television is an important part of the earlier hours of Christmas Eve. Attending one of the many stage productions of Putti Plutti Pott and Santa's Beard is also a very popular tradition.

December 25 is a very quiet and relaxed day. Church services are well attended. The old tradition of a very early morning service before breakfast has been replaced in most areas by a service in the later morning. Afterward, many families get together for a large festive meal.

December 26 is also a day of many festivities. Cinemas, night clubs and bars are full, and there are many private gatherings and parties, where all kinds of traditional Christmas cookies and sweets are enjoyed. Fatty, tasty dinners are also part of it. The time between Boxing Day and New Year's Eve is called romjul. January 6 (the 13th day of Christmas) is commonly regarded as the end of Christmas, while some end Christmas on the 20th day, and some even at Candlemas.

Sweden 

The pre-Christian holiday of Yule, or jól, was the most important holiday in Scandinavia and Northern Europe. Originally the observance of the winter solstice, and the rebirth of the sun, it brought about many practices that remain in the Advent and Christmas celebrations today. The Yule season was a time for feasting, drinking, gift-giving, and gatherings, but also the season of awareness and fear of the forces of the dark. Swedish Christmas celebrations begin with the first of Advent. Saint Lucy's Day (locally known as ) is the first major Christmas celebration before Christmas itself. The eldest daughter arising early and wearing her Lucy garb of white robe, red sash, and a wire crown covered with whortleberry-twigs with nine lighted candles fastened in it awakens the family, singing "Santa Lucia", serving them coffee and saffron buns (St. Lucia buns), thus ushering in the Christmas season.

Schools elect students to play the part of Lucia and her maids, and a national Lucia is elected on national television from regional winners. The regional Lucias will visit shopping malls, old people's homes and churches, singing and handing out , gingerbread cookies.

Boys take part in the procession as well, playing different roles associated with Christmas. Some may be dressed in the same kind of white robe, but with a cone-shaped hat decorated with golden stars, called  ('star boys'); some may be dressed up as tomtenissar, carrying lanterns; and some may be dressed up as gingerbread men. They participate in the singing and also have a song or two of their own, usually , which tells the story about Saint Stephen, the first Christian martyr, caring for his five horses.
Electric candles and glowing stars are placed in almost every window in the month of December in Sweden. Although December 25 is a Swedish public holiday, December 24 is the day when Santa Claus  (or simply Tomte) brings the presents. Although not a public holiday, Christmas Eve is a de facto holiday in the sense that most workplaces are closed, and those who work, for instance in shops or care homes, get extra wages as a compensation.

The  was originally a small invisible Christmas house gnome or dwarf from Nordic mythology, who watched over the house and its inhabitants. If a bowl of porridge is not laid out for him somewhere in or outside the house, he will bring bad luck to everyone in the house the next year. The modern  is a version of Santa Claus in red clothes and white beard, except that he does not enter the house through the chimney, but knocks on the door and asks "" ('are there any nice children here?')

Christmas is, as everywhere else, an occasion celebrated with food. Almost all Swedish families celebrate on December 24 with a Christmas table, called Christmas smörgåsbord (julbord), a display of several Christmas food items. Almost all  have Christmas ham, (julskinka) accompanied by other Christmas dishes, such as small meatballs, pickled herring, spareribs, small hot dogs, lutfisk, pork sausage, salmon, Janssons frestelse (potato casserole with anchovy), and rice pudding. The Christmas  is served with julmust and beverages  like mulled wine, Christmas beer or snaps. A Scandinavian speciality is the glögg (mulled and spiced wine with almonds and raisins), which is served hot in small cups. The different dishes of the  may vary throughout Sweden, from south to north. Businesses traditionally invite their employees to a  dinner or lunch in the weeks before Christmas, and people go out privately to restaurants which also customarily offer julbord during December.

Examples of candies and treats associated with Christmas are marzipan, toffee, knäck (quite similar to butterscotch), nuts and fruits: figs, chocolate, dates and oranges decorated with cloves.

Television also plays a big role, many families watch the Disney Christmas special  (From All of Us to All of You), Karl Bertil Jonssons julafton (animated short), or a re-run of the Svensson, Svensson episode "" ('Merry Christmas') on the TV channel SVT1.

Many Swedes still adhere to the tradition that each present should have a rhyme written on the wrapping paper, to hint at the contents without revealing them.

If one has two families to celebrate Christmas with, it is common that one of the families move their celebrations to Christmas Day or the day before Christmas Eve (commonly referred to as little Christmas Eve).

After December 24, the Christmas celebrations have more or less come to an end. Some people attend the julottan, an early morning church service on December 25. This particular service was the main service of Christmas historically—nowadays, the Midnight Mass has become increasingly popular. Others attend a simpler service called Christmas Prayer in the afternoon of Christmas Eve; however, many Swedes do not attend church at all during Christmas as the country is very secular.

Southern Europe

Bosnia and Herzegovina, Croatia and Slovenia 

In Bosnia and Herzegovina, Croatia and Slovenia, Christmas is celebrated mainly as a religious holiday. The festivities begin on Saint Nicholas's Day on December 6 (in Slovenia) or St. Lucy's on December 13 depending on what region (in Croatia). St. Lucy or St. Nicholas brings children presents, and St. Nicholas is said to be accompanied by Krampus who steals away the presents of bad children. This "anti-Santa" is said to have one cloven hoof, a handful of heavy chains, and a sack on his back to collect naughty children. In Croatia on St. Lucy's, families will plant wheat seeds in a bowl of shallow water, which will grow several inches by Christmas and are then tied together with a red, blue and white ribbon called .

On Christmas Eve (('holy eve')), three candles representing the Trinity are lit and placed in the middle of the wheat; the glow symbolizes the soul of each person. On this day, the tree is decorated, the home is decked with greenery and the women prepare the Christmas meal. In many villages, straw (which symbolizes Christ's birth in the manger) is spread around the floors of the home for the Christmas Eve dinner. As is customary with Catholic people, meat is not consumed in Croatia, while in Slovenia it is. Instead of meat in Croatia and with other food in Slovenia, salad and fish is served, many choosing to eat the Dalmatian specialty , dried cod fish. The family then sprinkle holy water on their Yule log which they light and watch. Amen").

Many families will go to a midnight mass on Christmas Eve and often another on Christmas Day. It is common for Christmas presents to be placed under the tree, to suggest that the Angel or the Baby Jesus leaves them there while others are attending midnight mass. Presents are opened after the mass. Christmas is a day of celebrating with family; a large feast is prepared and traditional foods such as stuffed cabbage, turkey, pot roast, pita and smoked meat are served, along with various desserts such as fritule, potica (especially in Slovenia), strudel, and cookies.

Slovenes are also visited by another one of their  ('three good men'), who bring presents in December: Saint Nicholas, Santa Claus and Dedek Mraz ('Grandfather Frost'). Families mostly celebrate New Year's Eve at home with extended family members, friends, and sometimes neighbours. Women prepare cabbage sarma, which they will eat on January 1 to symbolize good fortune, and steak tartare, which they eat on New Year's Eve on toast with butter. At midnight, people go outdoors to watch fireworks, while Dedek Mraz leaves presents under the tree. Epiphany on January 6 marks the end of the Christmas season.

Bulgaria 

Traditionally, Christmas Eve would be the climax of the Nativity Fast, and thus only an odd number of lenten dishes are presented on that evening. The table is usually not cleared after the dinner and until the next morning, to leave some food for the holy spirits – a custom which probably comes from pagan pre-Christian times. On that day, a Bulgarian budnik is set alight. On Christmas, however, meat dishes are already allowed and are typically served.

Among the Bulgarian Christmas traditions is koleduvane, which involves boy carolers visiting the neighbouring houses starting at midnight on Christmas Eve, wishing health, wealth and happiness. Another custom is the baking of a traditional round loaf (pita). The pita is broken into pieces by the head of the family and a piece is given to each family member, a valuable possession, and a piece for God. A coin is hidden inside the pita and whoever gets the coin will have luck, health, and prosperity in the coming year.

As in other countries, a Christmas tree is typically set up and the entire house is decorated. However, it has been largely forgotten after 1989, when Dyado Koleda again returned as the more popular figure.

Greece and Cyprus 

The festive period lasts from November 30 to January 6 (Epiphany) on the Greek calendar. December 25 and 26 is a public holiday in Greece. Most families set up Christmas trees and shops have decorations and lights. Presents are placed under the Christmas tree and are opened on January 1, St Basil's Day. In Greek tradition, Basil's (of Caesarea) name was given to Father Christmas and is supposed to visit children and give presents on January 1 (when Basil's memory is celebrated), unlike other European traditions, where this person is Saint Nicholas and comes every Christmas. Carol singing is another tradition on Christmas and New Year's Eve. The Christmas meal usually includes lamb or pork and desserts such as kourabies and melomakarona. Other Christmas and New Year foods include baklava, kataifi (pastry), and thiples (a kind of fried pastry).

Children go singing carols from house to house either before or on Christmas Day. People go to church early the morning of Christmas on December 25. Christmas morning after church there is the practice to become the "pork batches," served with wine to open the appetite, and "thick," done by Eve, which is boiled pork with plenty of lemon that is left to clot overnight. Pork dishes are a hallmark of Greek Christmas. In many Greek cities and ports like Thessaloniki, Volos, Patra, and the Greek Islands, traditional Christmas boats are decorated. And in many central squares of the country a large Christmas tree is decorated, where many of the Christmas festivals take place.

It is an ancient tradition whose origin has been lost to time.
In Mani there are beliefs about demonic and other supernatural beings, who come from the Twelve Days of Christ as the Epiphany. These are the goblins and say that they are the descendants God Pan or Satyrs, who jumped from the mythology in the Christian life.

Italy 

The Feast of the Immaculate Conception on December 8 is a national holiday in Italy. Christmas decorations, including the presepe (nativity scene), as well as the Christmas tree, are usually put up on this day. Some modern takes on this holiday involve them hanging vultures to symbolize the cleaning of their spirits.

Saint Lucy's Day is celebrated as a Catholic holiday in Sicily and the northern regions of Italy on the supposed shortest day of the year, which is December 13. St. Lucy (Santa Lucia) is the patron saint of the city of Syracuse. Evening candlelight processions called the Parade of Light are conducted and are followed by the Feast of St. Lucy. Sicilians pay tribute to a miracle performed by St. Lucy during a famine in 1582. At that time, she brought a flotilla of grain-bearing ships to starving Sicily, whose citizens cooked and ate the wheat without taking time to grind it into flour. Thus, on St. Lucy's Day, Sicilians do not eat anything made with wheat flour. Instead they eat cooked wheat called cuccìa.

It is quite common to attend Midnight Mass on Christmas Eve and practice the custom not to eat any meat. The dinner traditionally consists of seafood, followed by typical Italian Christmas sweets, such as pandoro, panettone, torrone, panforte, struffoli, caggionetti, Monte Bianco or others, depending on the regional cuisine. Christmas on the 25th is celebrated with a family lunch, consisting of different types of meat dishes, cheese and local sweets.

The ancient Christmas festival called Ndocciata is celebrated on December 8 and Christmas Eve in Agnone, Molise, with a parade of torches leading up to the "Bonfire of Brotherhood".

On Christmas Eve, in the squares of many towns of eastern Sicily, a large bonfire, is lit to warm the Baby Jesus.

Traditions regarding the exchanging of gifts vary from region to region, as this might take place either on Christmas Eve or on Christmas Day. Presents for children are left underneath the Christmas tree either by Santa Claus (called Babbo Natale) or, according to older traditions, by Baby Jesus himself. In some regions children receive gifts earlier (at St. Lucy's Day) or later (on Epiphany).

December 26, (St. Stephen's Day, in Italian ), is also a public holiday in Italy. Festivities extend to the end of the year and then to the Epiphany.

On January 6 (Epiphany, in Italian ) decorations are usually taken down, and in some areas female puppets are burned on a pyre (called falò), to symbolize, along with the end of the Christmas period, the death of the old year and the beginning of a new one.
While gifts are now given at Christmas by an American-style Santa Claus as well, Italy holds fast to its tradition of native gift-givers. On the eve of the 6th, la Befana, the good Epiphany witch, is thought to ride the night skies on broomstick, bringing good children gifts and sweets, and bad ones charcoal or bags of ashes. In other areas it is the Three Wise Men who bring gifts, especially oranges symbolizing gold, and chocolate symbolizing their kisses to good children. In other places such as Treviso, the day is celebrated with bonfires, the sparks of which are said to predict the future of the new year.

Malta 

Christmas in Malta is mostly secular, with a number of Christian-related themes.

Midnight Masses are popular among the older generations, and Christmas processions take place on Christmas Eve with a statue of the baby Jesus in towns and villages, led by the Society of Christian Doctrine.

A public holiday in Malta, Christmas Day is celebrated on December 25. Christmas lunch usually consists of turkey served with potatoes and vegetables (Malta is a former British colony). The island has adopted other popular secular customs and traditions such as the Christmas tree and Father Christmas.

Presents are normally exchanged either on Christmas Eve or on Christmas Day. These Maltese Christmas sweets are eaten as a dessert during the Christmas season but can also be purchased year-round. Christmas cribs are popular and are seen in most homes.

Another Christmas tradition is the planting of common vetch seeds in flat-bottomed pots. They are planted around the beginning of December, normally placed on white cotton and watered every day whilst being kept in the dark all the time. They are usually taken out just before Christmas, and resemble long white spaghetti-like strands of leaves (since they would have grown in the dark).

Portugal 

An official holiday in Portugal, Christmas is widely celebrated and associated with family gatherings. Many who have moved to the urban centers of Lisbon or Porto, along with many who have emigrated to other countries, still travel to their hometown to spend Christmas Eve with their families. The traditional cake  (king cake) is served on Epiphany. Although Santa Claus is increasingly more popular, in some regions people still attest that  (Baby Jesus) brings presents to children.

Serbia and Montenegro 

In Serbia and Montenegro, Christmas (or more formally ) is celebrated for three consecutive days, beginning with Christmas Day. The Serbian Orthodox Church uses the traditional Julian calendar, per which Christmas Day (December 25) falls on January 7. This day is called the first day of Christmas, and the following two are accordingly called the second, and the third day of Christmas. During this festive time, one is to greet another person with "Christ is Born," which should be responded to with "Truly He is Born."

This holiday surpasses all the others celebrated by Serbs, with respect to the diversity of applied folk customs and rituals. These may vary from region to region, some of them having modern versions adapted to the contemporary way of living. The ideal environment to carry them out fully is the traditional multi-generation country household.

In the morning of Christmas Eve a young, straight oak tree is selected and felled by the head of the household. A log is cut from it and is referred to as the badnjak. For the convenience of people who live in towns and cities, they can be bought at marketplaces or received in churches.

The dinner on this day is festive, copious and diverse in foods, although it is prepared in accordance with the rules of fasting. Groups of young people go from house to house of their village or neighbourhood, congratulating each other, singing, and making performances; this continues through the next three days. The Serbs also take a bundle of straw into the house and spread it over the floor, and then put walnuts on it. Before the table is served for the Christmas Eve dinner, it is strewn with a thin layer of straw and covered with a white cloth. The head of household makes the Sign of the Cross, lights a candle, and censes the whole house. The family members sit down at the table, but before tucking in they all rise and a man or boy among them says a prayer, or they together sing the Troparion of the Nativity.
After the dinner young people visit their friends, a group of whom may gather at the house of one of them. Christmas and other songs are sung, while the elderly narrate stories from the olden times.

On Christmas Day, the celebration is announced at dawn by church bells and by shooting. A big importance is given to the first visit a family receives that day. People expect that it will summon prosperity and well-being for their household in the ensuing year; this visit is often pre-arranged. Christmas dinner is the most celebratory meal a family has during a year. A special, festive loaf of bread is baked for this occasion. The main course is roast pork of a pig which they cook whole by rotating it impaled on a wooden spit close to an open fire. Even though gift-giving is not necessarily a part of the tradition, a Santa Claus-inspired character called  (translated as 'Christmas friend') sometimes takes his part in gift-giving, as Santa Claus is more traditionally connected to New Year's celebrations. Gift-giving is, nevertheless, connected with the celebrations, being traditionally done on the three consecutive Sundays that immediately precede it. Children, women, and men, respectively, are the set gift-givers on these three days.

Since the early 1990s, the Serbian Orthodox Church has, together with local communities, organized public celebrations on Christmas Eve. The course of these celebrations can be typically divided into three parts: the preparation, the ritual, and the festivity. In some parishes they build the fire on which to burn the  not in the church yard but at some other suitable location in their town or village. The festivity consists of getting together around the fire and socializing. Each particular celebration, however, has its own specificities which reflect traditions of the local community, and other local factors.

In Serbia, Montenegro and North Macedonia Christmas is celebrated on January 7. This is a result of their Eastern Orthodox churches marking Christmas Day based on the Julian calendar, which is now 13 days behind the internationally used Gregorian calendar.

Spain 

Christmas is an officially recognized holiday in Spain. In most of Spain, the Christmas period lasts from Christmas Eve (that is, 'Good Night') on December 24 to Epiphany on January 6. Many homes and most churches display a Nativity scene, a Christmas tree, or both. In Catalonia on the 26th,  (Saint Stephen) is celebrated with a family gathering.

In most of Spain (though not in a few areas, such as Catalonia), a large family dinner is celebrated on Christmas Eve and can last until late in the night. There is a wide variety of typical foods one might find on plates across Spain on this particular night, and each region has its own distinct specialties. It is particularly common to start the meal with a seafood dish such as prawns or salmon, followed by a bowl of hot, homemade soup. The main meal will often consist of roast lamb, or seafood, such as cod or shellfish. For dessert, there is quite a spread of delicacies, among them turrón, a dessert made of honey, egg and almonds. Special dishes and desserts include shellfish and fish, marzipan, turkey with truffles, and polvorones (shortbread made of almonds, flour and sugar).

Even though there is still the traditional Misa del Gallo at midnight, few Spaniards continue to follow the old custom of attending.

In most of Spain, Christmas day was not associated with presents for children until recently; instead, the Three Magi brought the presents on the night of January 5, as they still do.

In the evening of December 31 there is also a large family feast.

In the evening of January 5 a huge parade or cavalcade welcomes the Three Magi to the city. Children put their shoes in the window on January 5 in the hope that the Three Wise Men will deliver them presents.

Western Europe

France 

Christmas in France ( on the French calendar) is celebrated mainly in a religious manner, though secular ways of celebrating the occasion also exist, such as Christmas decorations and carols. Children do not hang Christmas stockings but put their shoes by the fireplace or under the Christmas tree so  (Father Christmas or Santa Claus) can give them gifts (a practice also among French-speaking Switzerland). Some families also attend Midnight Mass and decorate their homes with Nativity scenes depicting the birth of Jesus. Additional  ('little saints') may be added in the nativity scenes.

In France and in other French-speaking areas (see French Canada), a long family dinner, called a réveillon, is held on Christmas Eve. The name of this dinner is based on the word  (meaning 'waking'), because participation involves staying awake until midnight and beyond.  is generally of an exceptional or luxurious nature. Appetizers may include lobster, oysters, escargots or foie gras, etc. One traditional dish is turkey with chestnuts.  in Quebec will often include some variety of tourtière. Dessert may consist of a bûche de Noël. In Provence, the tradition of the 13 desserts is followed, almost invariably including  (a flavoured bread), dates, etc. Quality wine is usually consumed at such dinners, often with champagne or similar sparkling wines as a conclusion. Christmas carols may also be sung.

United Kingdom 

In the United Kingdom Christmas decorations are put up in shops and town centres from early November. Many towns and cities have a public event involving a local or regional celebrity to mark the switching on of Christmas lights. Decorations in people's homes are commonly put up from early December, traditionally including a Christmas tree, cards, and lights both inside and outside the home. Every year, Norway donates a giant Christmas tree for the British to raise in Trafalgar Square as a thank you for helping during the Second World War. Christmas carolers at Trafalgar Square in London sing around the tree on various evenings up until Christmas Eve and Christmas decorations are traditionally left up until the evening of January 5 (the night before Epiphany); it is considered bad luck to have Christmas decorations up after this date. In practice, many Christmas traditions, such as the playing of Christmas music, largely stop after Christmas Day.

Mince pies are traditionally sold during the festive season and are a popular food for Christmas. It is common in many UK households for children and adults to put up advent calendars in their homes, which may either contain chocolates or Christmas scenes behind their doors.

A common feature of the Christmas season is the Nativity play which is practiced in most primary and some secondary schools across the UK. This practice is becoming less common, and other plays may be performed instead with less overt religious tones. Midnight Mass is also celebrated by Anglicans, Catholics, and other denominations, and services take place in nearly all Church of England parishes on Christmas Eve.

On Christmas Eve, presents are supposedly delivered in stockings and under the Christmas tree by Father Christmas, who previously had been something like the Ghost of Christmas Present in Charles Dickens' A Christmas Carol (1843), but who has now become mainly conflated with Santa Claus. The two names are now used interchangeably and are equally known to British people, though some distinctive features still remain. Many families tell their children stories about Father Christmas and his reindeer. One tradition is to put out a plate of carrots for the reindeer, and mince pies and sherry for Father Christmas to help him on his way.

The majority of families open their presents on the morning of Christmas Day, the Royal family being a notable exception, as they open their gifts on Christmas Eve, following German tradition introduced by the Hanoverians. Queen Victoria as a child made note of it in her diary for Christmas Eve 1832; the delighted 13-year-old princess wrote, "After dinner ... we then went into the drawing-room near the dining-room ... There were two large round tables on which were placed two trees hung with lights and sugar ornaments. All the presents being placed round the trees..". Since the first commercial Christmas card was produced in London in 1843, cards are sent in the weeks leading up to Christmas, many of which contain the English festive greeting Merry Christmas.

On Christmas Day, a public holiday in the United Kingdom, nearly the whole population has the day off to be with their family and friends, so they can gather round for a traditional Christmas dinner, traditionally comprising a turkey with cranberries, brussels sprouts, parsnips, Yorkshire pudding and roast potatoes, quite like the Sunday roast, and followed by a Christmas pudding. During the meal, Christmas crackers, containing toys, jokes, and a paper hat are pulled. Attendance at a Christmas Day church service has become less popular in modern times, with fewer than 3 million now attending a Christmas Day Church of England service.

The monarch releases a royal message on Christmas Day, in the form of a short programme carried on radio and television. The messages typically reflect on topics such as the year's events, the state of the royal family, and themes such as unity. The message averages 7 million viewers, and is often one of the most-watched programmes of the day on Christmas.

The celebration of Boxing Day, on the day after Christmas Day, is a tradition practiced in the UK. It is a bank holiday, and if it happens to fall on a weekend then a special Bank Holiday Monday will occur. Top-level football competitions such as the Premier League have traditionally held fixtures on Boxing Day.

Other traditions include carol singing – many carols are sung by children on people's doorsteps and by professional choirs – and sending Christmas cards. In public, there are decorations and lights in most shops, especially in town centres, and even in Indian and Chinese restaurants. Churches and cathedrals across the country hold masses, with many people going to midnight mass or a service on Christmas morning. Even though church attendance has been falling over the decades some people who do not go to church often think it is still important to go at Christmas, so Church attendance increases. Most theatres have a tradition of putting on a Christmas pantomime for children. The pantomime stories are traditionally based on popular children's stories such as Little Red Riding Hood and Aladdin, rather than being directly concerned with Christmas as such, although there is sometimes a link. Television is widely watched.

Public transport and vital transport services are closed-down on Christmas Day. The Christmas wind-down starts early, with last trains running out of the major cities as early as 19:00 on December 24. Bus, night bus, and underground services are also unavailable from about 21:00 hours. Individual transport companies start making announcements as early as October, and while one train operating company may choose to run no trains on Boxing Day another may run a limited Saturday service but totally close major stations.

In England, telling ghost stories, local legends, and other strange, bizarre, and fantastic "winter stories" (as Charles Dickens – author of A Christmas Carol – termed them) is a centuries-old tradition, to which William Shakespeare contributed with The Winter's Tale (1623) but which was well known even before Shakespeare's time. (In contrast, Ireland, Scotland, and the USA favor Halloween as a time for telling ghostly tales.) Colin Fleming details other contributors to this tradition in the Paris Review.

Wales 

Wales has a tradition of singing caneuon plygain, which is done on the week before Christmas day.

Scotland 

Christmas in Scotland was traditionally observed very quietly, because the Church of Scotland never placed much emphasis on the Christmas festival. However, in Catholic areas people would attend Midnight Mass or early morning mass before going to work. This tradition derives from the Church of Scotland's origins including St Columba's monastic tradition, under which every day is God's day and there is none more special than another; thus Good Friday is not an official public holiday in Scotland. 
Christmas Day was commonly a normal working day in Scotland until the 1960s, and even into the 1970s in some areas. The New Year's Eve festivity, Hogmanay, was by far the largest celebration in Scotland. The gift-giving, public holidays and feasting associated with mid-winter were traditionally held between December 11 and January 6. However, since the 1980s, the fading of the Church's influence and the increased influences from the rest of the UK and elsewhere, Christmas and its related festivities are now nearly on a par with Hogmanay and Ne'erday, New Year's Day. The capital city of Edinburgh now has a traditional German Christmas market from late November until Christmas Eve and on the first Sunday in Advent a Nativity scene is blessed by the Cardinal Archbishop in the main square. Bannock cakes made of oatmeal are traditionally eaten at Christmas.

Ireland 

Christmas in Ireland is the largest celebration of the Irish public holidays and lasts from December 24 to January 6, although many view December 8 as being the start of the season, as schools used to close on this day, making it a traditional Christmas shopping time. This is no longer compulsory and many schools stay open.

Almost the entire workforce is finished by lunchtime on Christmas Eve, or often a few days beforehand. Christmas Day and St. Stephen's Day are public holidays, and many people do not return to work until after New Year's Day. In 2006, the total amount spent in Ireland to celebrate Christmas was €16 billion, which averages at approximately €4,000 for every single person in the country.

It is extremely popular on Christmas Eve to go for "the Christmas drink" in the local pub, where regular punters are usually offered a Christmas drink. Many neighbours and friends attend each other's houses for Christmas drinks and parties on the days leading up to and after Christmas Day. Although religious devotion in Ireland today is considerably less than it used to be, there are huge attendances at religious services for Christmas Day, with Midnight Mass a popular choice. Most families arrange for their deceased relatives to be prayed for at these masses as it is a time of remembering the dead in Ireland. It is traditional to decorate graves at Christmas with a wreath made of holly and ivy. Even in the most undevout of homes in Ireland the traditional crib takes centre stage along with the Christmas tree as part of the family's decorations. Some people light candles to signify symbolic hospitality for Mary and Joseph. Therefore, it is usual to see a white candle, or candle set, placed in several windows around people's homes. The candle was a way of saying there was room for Jesus's parents in these homes even if there was none in Bethlehem. It is traditional to leave a mince pie and a bottle or a glass of Guinness for Santa Claus along with a carrot for Rudolph on Christmas Eve.

Family and friends also give each other gifts at Christmas. The traditional Christmas dinner consists of turkey or goose and ham with a selection of vegetables and a variety of potatoes. Dessert includes Christmas pudding, Christmas cake, and mince pies with rich sauces such as brandy butter.

This festival, which coincides with Epiphany, is also known as Women's Christmas in Cork and Kerry.

Netherlands and Flanders 

Christmas traditions in the Netherlands are almost the same as those in Dutch-speaking parts of Belgium (Flanders). The Dutch recognize two days of Christmas as public holidays in the Netherlands, calling December 25  ('first Christmas day') and December 26  ('second Christmas day'). In families, it is customary to spend these days with either side of the family.

In Catholic parts of the country, it used to be common to attend Christmas Eve Midnight Mass; this custom is upheld, but mostly by the elder generation and by fewer people every year. Christmas Eve is these days a rather normal evening without any special gatherings or meals. On Christmas Day, throughout both Flanders and the Netherlands elaborate meals are prepared by the host or together as a family. It is also common to have meals where each guest prepares and brings one dish. 

Christmas decorations start appearing in stores right after Sinterklaas. The week before Christmas is important to the retail trade because it is the biggest sales week in the country. Christmas songs are heard everywhere. The cities of Amsterdam, Rotterdam, The Hague and Eindhoven are the busiest cities in terms of entertainment on Christmas Day. Traditionally, people in the Netherlands and Flanders do not exchange gifts on Christmas, since this is already done during a separate holiday (Sinterklaas) a few weeks before Christmas. However, more and more people have in the 2000s and 2010s started to give presents on Christmas as well, possibly under the influence of commerce and from other countries where Christmas is celebrated with many presents (notably the US). In the north/east, the West Low German part of the Netherlands, some people will blow the Midwinter horns from Advent until Epiphany.

Children, especially in the north of the Netherlands, dress up as the Three Wise Men and travel in groups of three carrying lanterns, re-enacting the Epiphany and singing traditional songs for their hosts. In return they are rewarded with cakes and sweets. This practice is less common south of the great rivers. In the south and east of the Netherlands it is common practice to burn the Christmas trees of the community on a big pile on January 6 to celebrate the end of Christmas and the start of the new year.

Oceania

Australia 

In Australia, as with all of the Southern Hemisphere, Christmas occurs during the height of the summer season. Christmas Day and Boxing Day (December 25–26) are recognized as national public holidays in Australia, and workers are therefore entitled to a day off with pay.

The Australian traditions and decorations are quite similar to those of the United Kingdom and North America, and similar wintry iconography is commonplace. This means a red fur-coated Santa Claus riding a sleigh, carols such as "Jingle Bells", and various snow-covered Christmas scenes on Christmas cards and decorations appear in the middle of summer. There have also been depictions of Christmas traditions tailored to Australian iconography, such as Santa partaking in activities such as surfing (in 2015, a world record was set on Bondi Beach for the world's largest surf lesson, featuring 320 participants in Santa suits), parodies of traditional carols, and original songs such as Rolf Harris's Six White Boomers (which depicts Santa Claus as using a ute pulled by kangaroos instead of reindeer and a sleigh).

A notable Christmas event in Australia is Carols by Candlelight—an annual concert and charity appeal benefiting the charity Vision Australia.

New Zealand 

Christmas Day and Boxing Day are both statutory holidays in New Zealand. While Boxing Day is a standard statutory holiday, Christmas Day is one of the three-and-a-half days of the year where all but the most essential businesses and services must close. Many of New Zealand's Christmas traditions are similar to those of Australia in that they are a mix of United Kingdom and North American traditions conducted in summer. New Zealand celebrates Christmas with very little traditional Northern Hemisphere winter imagery. The pohutukawa (Metrosideros excelsa), which produces large crimson flowers in December, is an often used symbol for Christmas in New Zealand, and subsequently the pohutukawa has become known as the New Zealand Christmas tree.

References

Further reading 

Rae, Simon (1996) The Faber Book of Christmas. London: Faber & Faber 
 Restad, Penne L. (1995) Christmas in America: a history. New York: Oxford University Press 
Tabori, Lena, ed. (1999) The Little Big Book of Christmas. New York: William Morrow 
Thomas M Landy, "Feasts", Catholics & Cultures updated May 12, 2016

External links 

 Jennifer Eremeeva, "And so, is this Christmas?" Russia Now, December 15, 2010.

Human geography